= List of Wolf's Head Society members =

Yale University student group

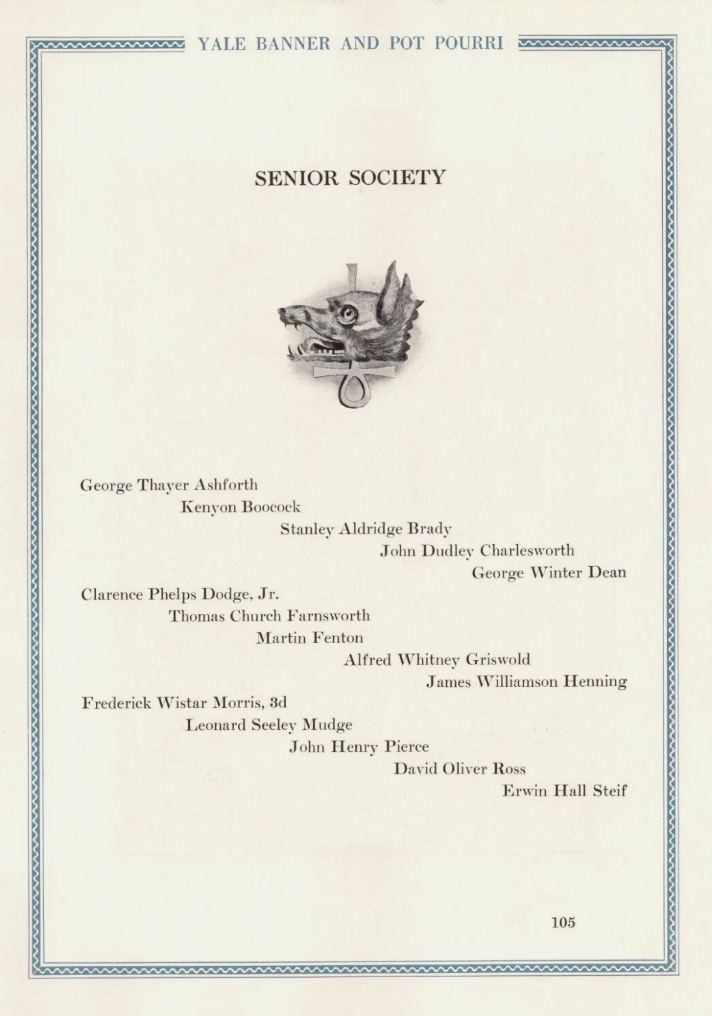
Wolf's Head entry from the 1929 Yale Banner

Wolf's Head Society is a senior society at Yale University in New Haven, Connecticut. Founded in 1883, it is one of Yale's oldest senior societies and is grouped by Yale Alumni Magazine with Skull and Bones and Scroll and Key as one of the three oldest "landed" societies at the university.

This list includes notable people whose membership in Wolf's Head has been reported in reliable published sources. The society's membership was historically more public than its internal proceedings: Yale Alumni Magazine has written that, by the late nineteenth century, the membership of Yale's senior societies was widely known through Tap Day, although their inner workings remained private. Annual lists of senior-society members were formerly published in Yale Alumni Magazine, the Yale Daily News, The New York Times, and the Yale Banner through 1970, after which members became less publicly identified.

Wolf's Head was originally an all-male organization. In December 1991, its alumni voted to admit women, making it the last of Yale's all-male senior societies to approve coeducational membership.

== Academia ==
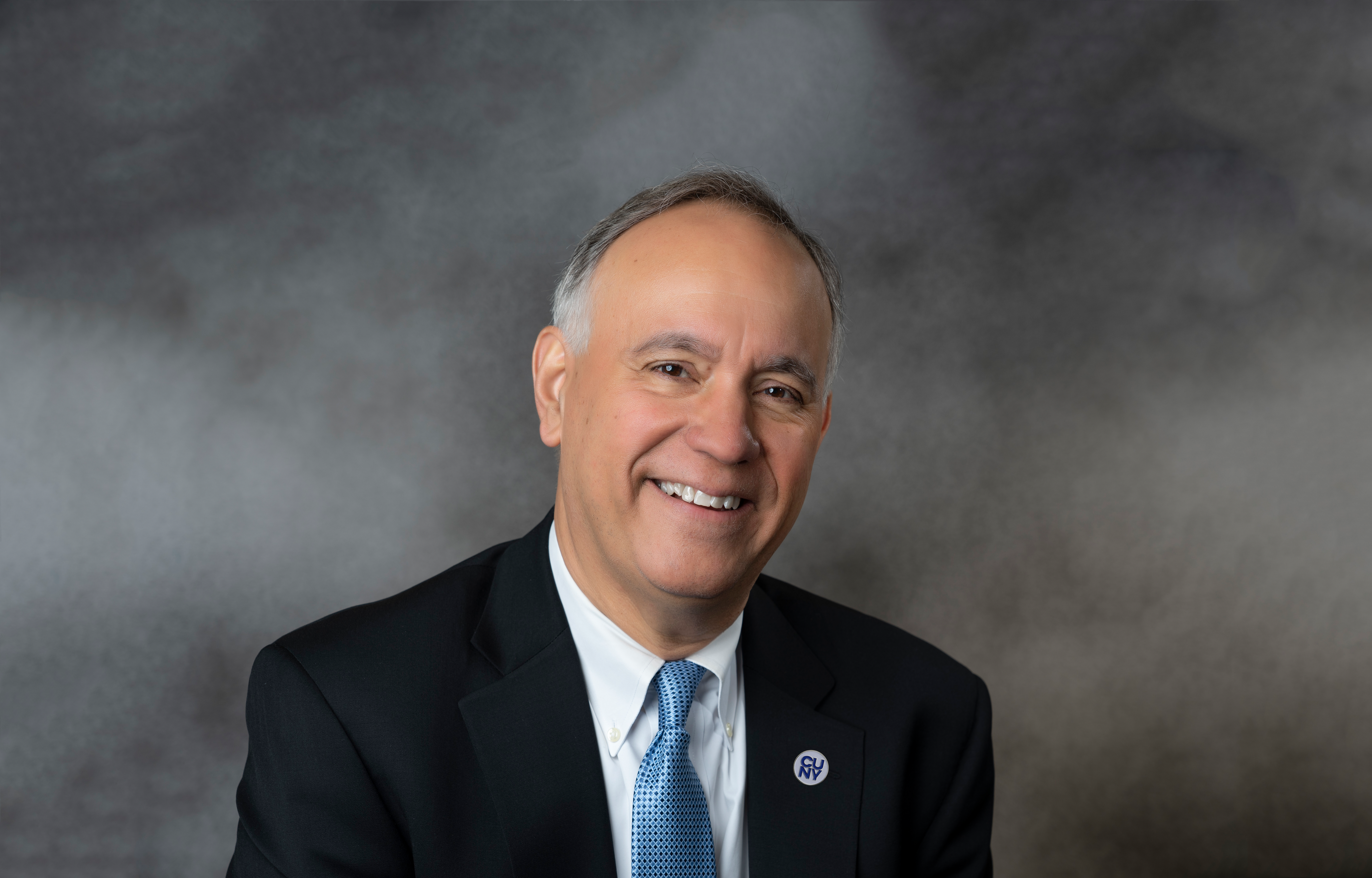
Félix Rodríguez

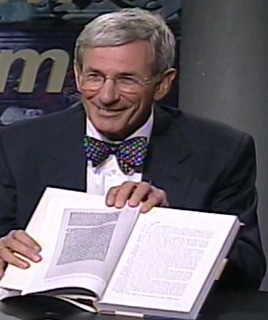
Richard Gilder

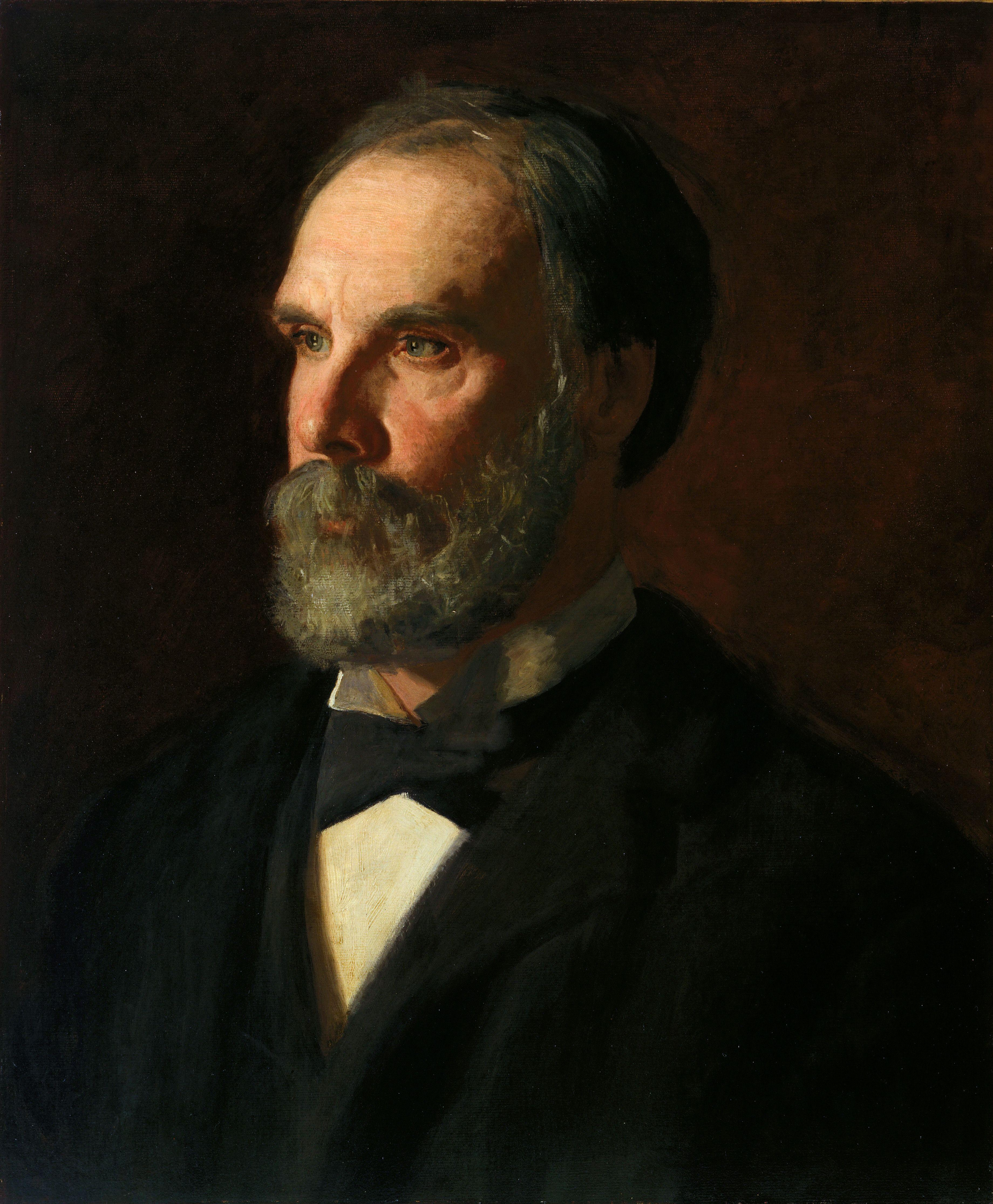
William Woolsey Johnson

Name	Yale class	Notability	Ref.
Frank Frost Abbott	1882	Classical scholar	
E. Tendayi Achiume	2005	Professor of law at Stanford Law School and former United Nations special rapporteur	
Douglass Marshall Allen	1963	Professor of philosophy and a founder of the Maine Peace Action Committee at the University of Maine	
Paul Butler	1982	Law professor of Georgetown University Law Center	
Sam Chauncey	1957	Administrator at Yale University during New Haven Black Panther trials	
Karilyn Crockett	1995	Historian and professor at the Massachusetts Institute of Technology; former chief of equity for the City of Boston	
Sumner McKnight Crosby	1932	Professor of art history at Yale University	
Terence Cuneo	1991	Marsh Chair Professor of Intellectual and Moral Philosophy at the University of Vermont	
William Shirley Fulton	1903	Archaeologist, founder of the Amerind Foundation, and director of the Museum of the American Indian Heye Foundation	
Richard Gilder	1954	Co-founder of the Gilder Lehrman Institute of American History; headed the brokerage firm Gilder, Gagnon, Howe & Co	
Alfred Whitney Griswold	1929	16th president of Yale University	
Ashbel Green Gulliver	1919	Dean of Yale Law School	
John N. Hazard	1930	Scholar of Soviet law and public administration and pioneer in the field of Sovietology	
Robert Maynard Hutchins	1921	5th president and chancellor of the University of Chicago and former dean of Yale Law School	
William Woolsey Johnson	1862	Professor of mathematics at the United States Naval Academy; co-founder of the American Mathematical Society	
Rashid Khalidi	1970	Professor emeritus of modern Arab studies at Columbia University	
George deForest Lord	1942	George M. Bodman Professor of English Literature at Yale University	
Felix V. Matos Rodriguez	1984	8th chancellor of City University of New York, cabinet secretary of the Puerto Rico Department of Family Affairs	
Benno C. Schmidt Jr.	1963	20th president of Yale University, former Dean of the Columbia Law School	
William Kelly Simpson	1947	Professor of Egyptology, archaeology, ancient Egyptian literature, and Afro-Asiatic languages at Yale University	
Gil Stein	1978	Professor of Near Eastern archaeology at the University of Chicago, former director of the Oriental Institute	

== Art and architecture ==
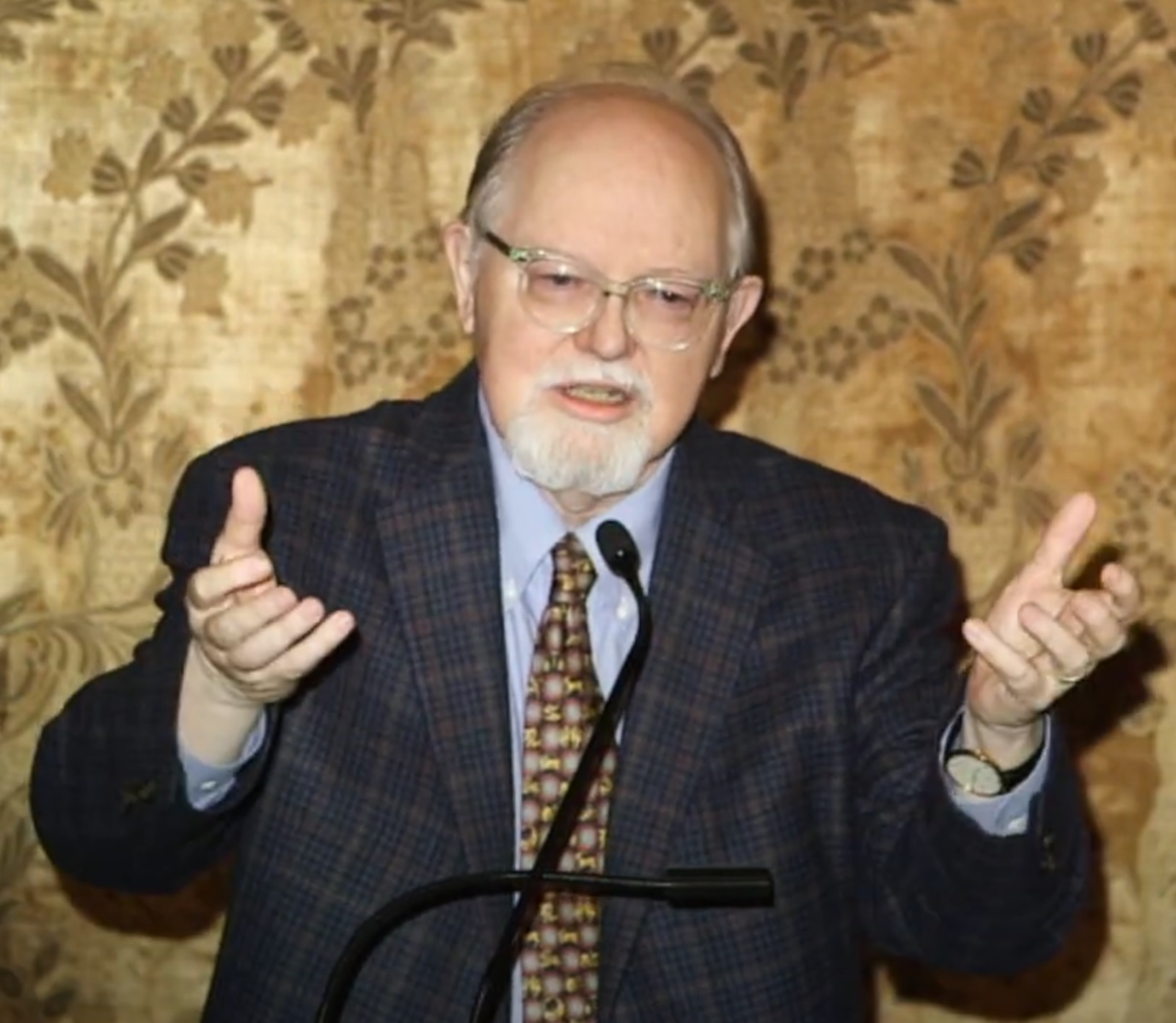
Richard Brettell

Name	Yale class	Notability	Ref.
Richard Brettell	1971	Director of the Dallas Museum of Art, chevalier and commandeur of the Ordre des Arts et Lettres, and fellow of the American Academy of Arts and Sciences	
George S. Chappell	1899	Architect, parodist, and journalist for Vanity Fair under the pseudonym Walter E. Traprock	
Jonathan Foote	1958	Architect associated with the preservation movement	
John Hill Morgan	1893	Assistant professor of American painting at Yale, authority on early American art, member of the New York State Assembly	
Rene di Rosa	1942	Vintner, art collector, and founder of the di Rosa Center for Contemporary Art	
Edmund Courtlandt Stanton	1876	Co-creator of the Metropolitan Opera House and co-manager Broadway's Garden Theatre	
Henry Raup Wagner	1884	Book collector, bibliographer, cartographer, historian, and business executive	
Sam Wagstaff	1944	Art curator, collector, and mentor of Robert Mapplethorpe and Patti Smith	
George Alexis Weymouth	1958	Artist, served on the United States Commission of Fine Arts, member of the Du Pont family	

== Business ==
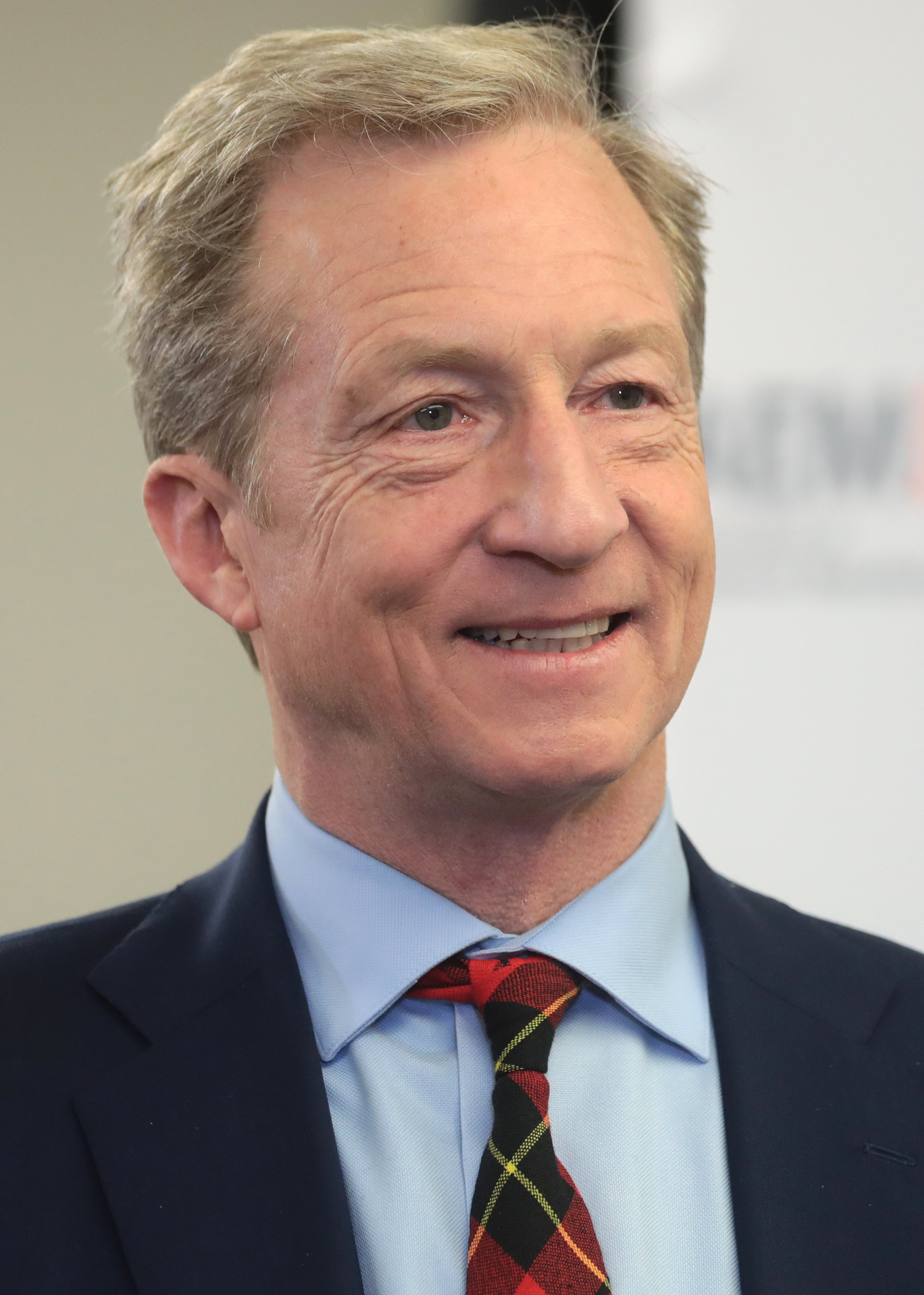
Tom Steyer

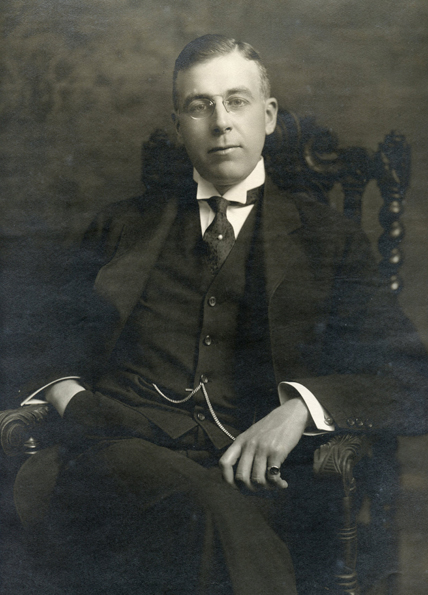
Edward Harkness

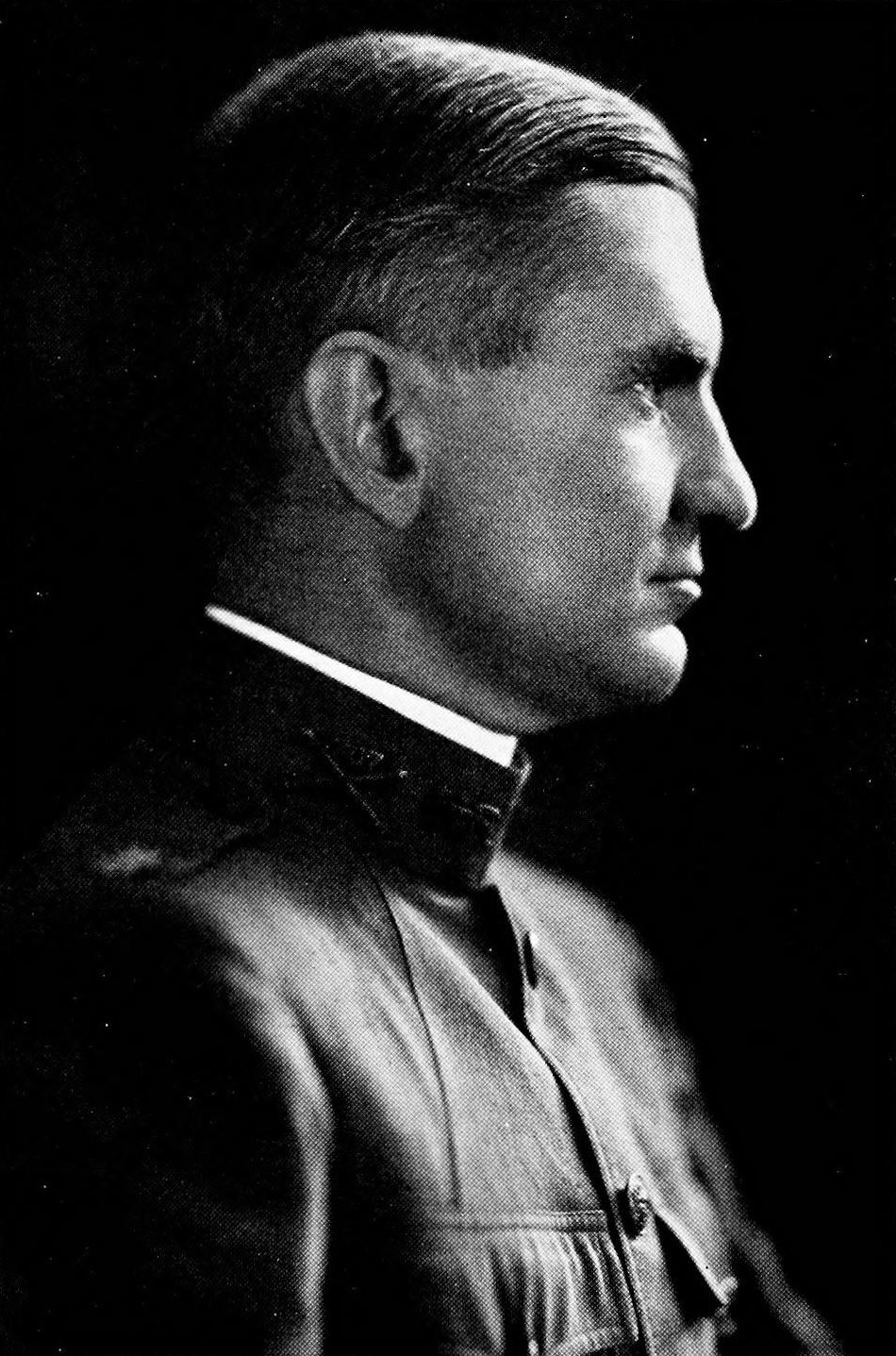
Anson Goodyear

Name	Yale class	Notability	Ref.
Sam Beard	1961	Social entrepreneur, co-founder of the Jefferson Awards for Public Service	
Morgan B. Brainard	1900	President of Aetna, and first president of baseball's National League	
William H. T. Bush	1960	President of the St. Louis-Boatmen's Bancshares; brother of George W. Bush	
Alexander Smith Cochran	1896	Manufacturer, sportsman and philanthropist	
Gifford A. Cochran	1924	Owner of Thoroughbred racehorses, winner of Kentucky Derby and the Preakness Stakes	
Craig F. Cullinan Jr.	1949	Chairman of the executive committee of the Houston Sports Association, acquired the Houston Astros Major League Baseball franchise rights	
William Clay Ford Sr.	1949	Owner of the Detroit Lions of the National Football League, last surviving grandchild of Henry Ford	
Anson Goodyear	1899	1st president of the Museum of Modern Art, member of the Goodyear family	
Edward B. Greene	1900	Chairman of the Cleveland-Cliffs Iron Mining Company	
Charles W. Harkness	1883	Director of Standard Oil; the Southern Pacific Railway Company and the Chicago, Milwaukee, and St. Paul Railway	
Edward Harkness	1896	Philanthropist; 6th-richest person in the United States (1918)	
William L. Harkness	1881	Businessman and inheritor of a large share of Standard Oil	
Charles Joseph Harris	1874	Industrialist and banker who developed mining, lumber, and civic institutions in western North Carolina	
Gardiner Greene Hubbard	1841	Founder of Bell Telephone Company (later AT&T), founder of National Geographic Society, founder of journal Science	
Lewis Lehrman	1960	Rite Aid president and founder of the Lehrman Institute	
Kevin Lin	2004	Co-founder and former chief operating officer of Twitch	
George Grant Mason Jr.	1926	Co-founder of Pan Am, appointed to the Civil Aeronautics Authority	
Roger Milliken	1937	President and CEO of Milliken & Company	
Paul Moore Sr.	1908	Founder of Republic Aviation; director of the Delaware, Lackawanna and Western Railroad	
Bruce Norris	1946	Businessman and longtime owner of the Detroit Red Wings hockey team	
William Henry Parsons	1882	Paper manufacturer and president of the New York Society for the Suppression of Vice	
Philip W. Pillsbury	1924	Chairman emeritus of the Pillsbury Company	
Godfrey A. Rockefeller	1946	Aviator, conservationist, and former executive director of the World Wildlife Fund	
Charles Addison Russell	1873	Manufacturer and U.S. representative for Connecticut's 3rd district, 1887–1902	
Michael Seibel	2005	Co-founder of Twitch / Justin.tv and partner at Y Combinator	
Tom Steyer	1979	Founder and senior partner of Farallon Capital, 2020 Presidential candidate	
William Earl Dodge Stokes	1874	Businessman with Phelps, Dodge & Company and real estate developer of New York City's Upper West Side	
Reginald Claypoole Vanderbilt	1902	Member of the Vanderbilt family and founder and president of numerous equestrian organizations	
Willard Lamb Velie	1888	Founder of Velie Motor Company and executive at Deere & Company	
Wheelock Whitney Jr.	1950	Investment banker, sports executive, philanthropist, and Minnesota politician	
William Wrigley III	1954	President of the Wm. Wrigley Jr. Company	
Shivon Zilis	2008	Technology executive and venture capitalist	

== Entertainment ==
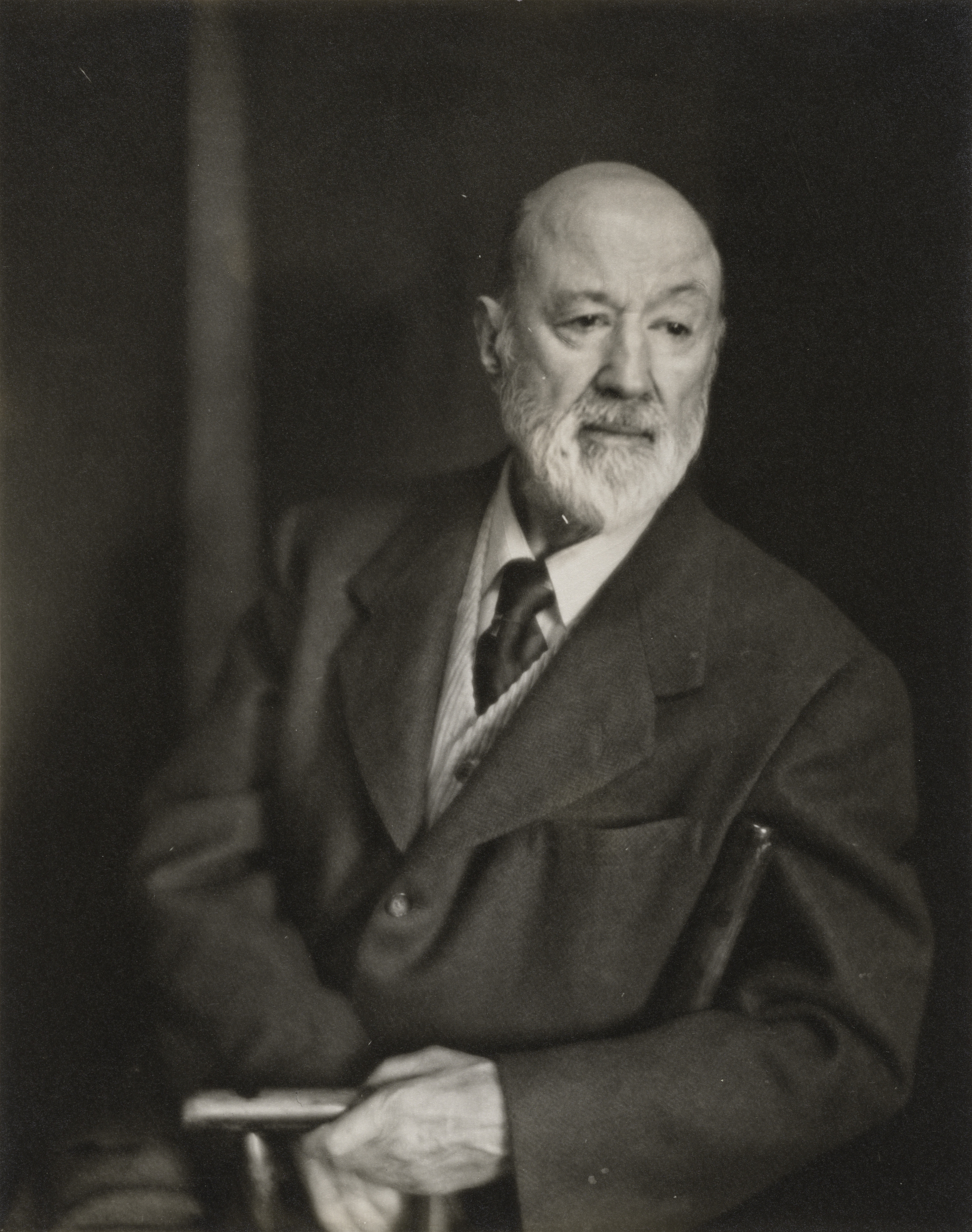
Charles Ives

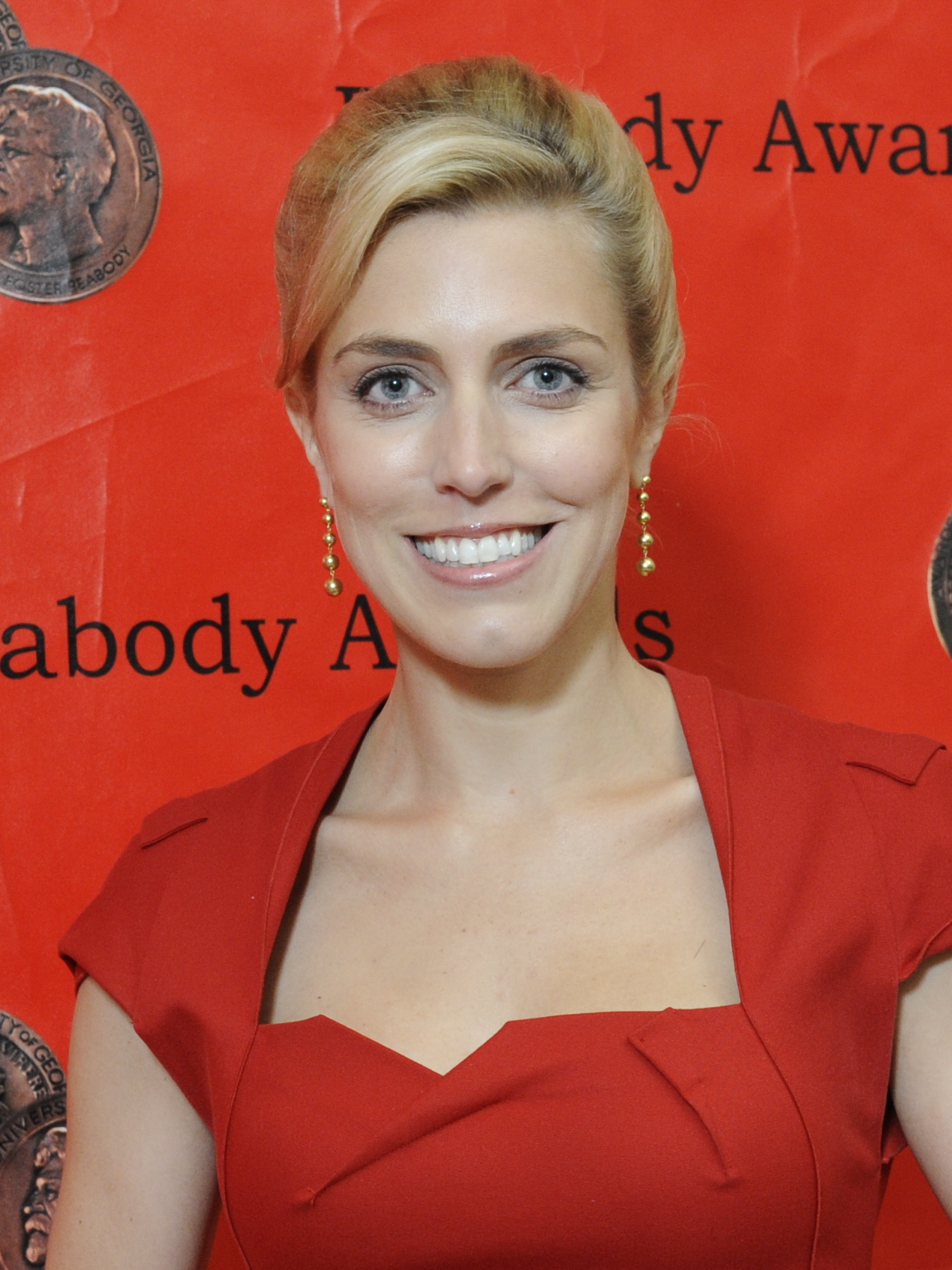
Clarissa Ward

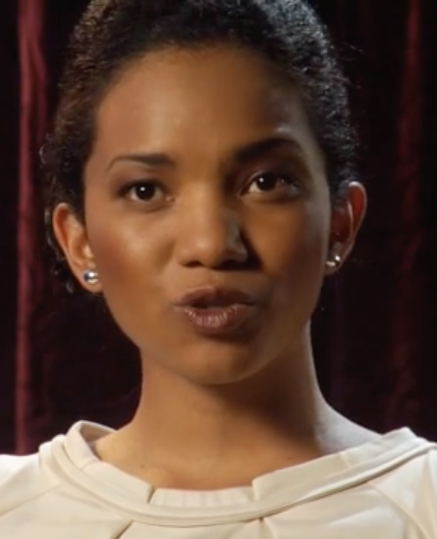
Chipo Chung

Name	Yale class	Notability	Ref.
Joshua Astrachan	1980	Film producer and co-founder of Animal Kingdom, an independent production company	
Rick Berlin	1967	Singer-songwriter, former frontman of Orchestra Luna, Luna, and Berlin Airlift	
Jeb Brown	1986	Broadway actor, known for Beautiful: The Carole King Musical and Dead Outlaw; Tony Award nominee	
Chipo Chung	2000	Actress and activist, known for Doctor Who, Sherlock, and Thomas & Friends	
Tom Davenport	1961	Documentary filmmaker and founder of Folkstreams, an online folklife film archive	
Seth Gordon	1998	Producer and director for PBS, the Gates Foundation, and the United Nations	
Charles Ives	1898	Modernist composer and pioneer in a systematic program of experimental music	
Ellis Ludwig-Leone	2011	Leader of the chamber pop group San Fermin	
Christopher Lydon	1962	Host of The Connection and creator of Open Source	
Tom Mankiewicz	1963	Screenwriter, director, and producer known for James Bond and Superman films	
Douglas Moore	1915	Composer, songwriter, organist, pianist, conductor, educator, actor, and author	
Lila Neugebauer	2007	Theatre director, writer, and artistic director	
Stan Salfas	1970	Film and television editor known for the modern Planet of the Apes films	
Clarissa Ward	2002	Emmy and Peabody Award-winning television journalist with CNN	
Meiyin Wang	2002	Singapore-born theatre director, producer, and curator; Lincoln Center arts executive	
Douglas Wick	1976	Academy Award-winning film producer, whose work includes producing Gladiator	
Doug Wright	1985	Obie Award and Tony Award-winning playwright and screenwriter	

== Law ==
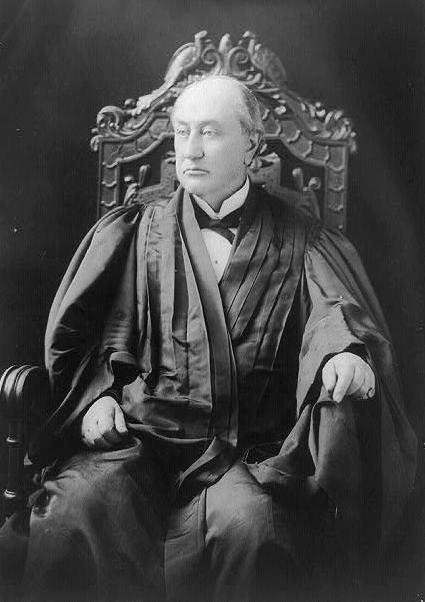
David Brewer

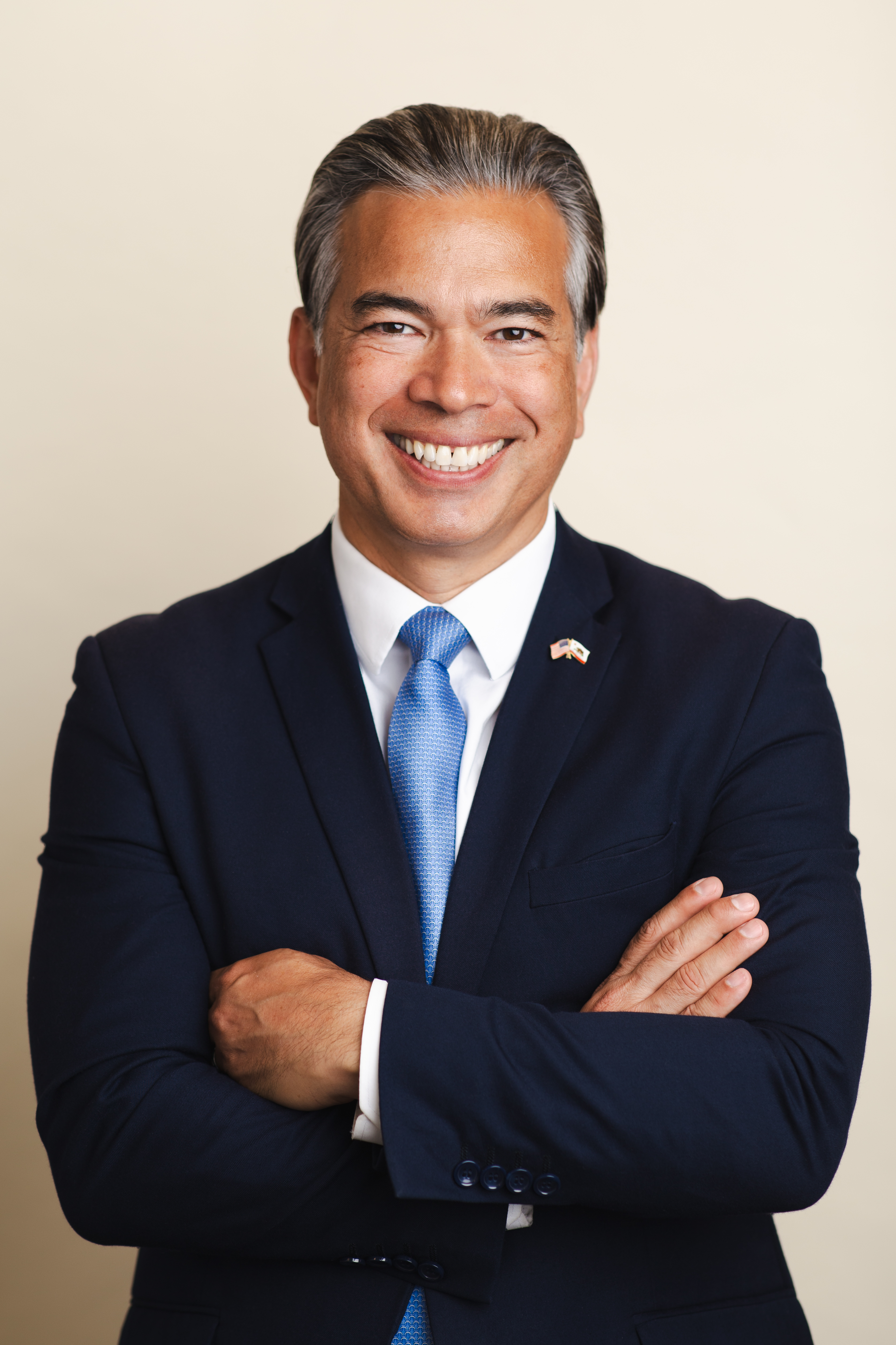
Rob Bonta

Name	Yale class	Notability	Ref.
Vanessa R. Avery	1996	Attorney and former U.S. attorney for the District of Connecticut	
James E. Baker	1982	Former chief judge of the United States Court of Appeals for the Armed Forces	
Rob Bonta	1993	34th attorney general of California	
David J. Brewer	1856	Justice of the Supreme Court of the United States	
Vernon S. Broderick	1985	Judge of the United States District Court for the Southern District of New York	
Paul Charlton	1878	Federal judge in Puerto Rico, advised the Bureau of Insular Affairs	
John Proctor Clarke	1878	Justice of the New York Supreme Court	
Edgar G. Crossman	1900	Attorney and senior partner in Davis, Polk, Wardwell, Sunderland & Kiendl (now Davis Polk & Wardwell	
George B. Daniels	1975	Senior judge of the United States District Court for the Southern District of New York	
Robert B. Fiske	1952	Attorney with Davis Polk & Wardwell and U.S. attorney for the Southern District of New York	
William Irwin Grubb	1883	Judge of the United States District Court for the Northern District of Alabama	
Kate Heinzelman	2004	General counsel of the Central Intelligence Agency (CIA) and attorney	
Wayne MacVeagh	1853	36th U.S. attorney general, U.S. ambassador to the Ottoman Empire, and U.S. ambassador to Italy	
Edward McCrady	1824	District attorney for the United States District Court for South Carolina	
John Garvan Murtha	1963	Federal judge and chief judge of the U.S. District Court for Vermont	
Edward John Phelps	1844	Founder of the American Bar Association and envoy to Court of St. James's	
Thomas Collier Platt Jr.	1946	U.S. district judge for the Eastern District of New York and former chief judge	
Thomas Gaskell Shearman	1889	Attorney, economist, co-founded Shearman & Sterling	
Cyrus Vance Jr.	1977	District attorney of New York County, New York	
John M. Walker Jr.	1962	Former chief judge of the United States Court of Appeals for the Second Circuit	

== Literature and journalism ==
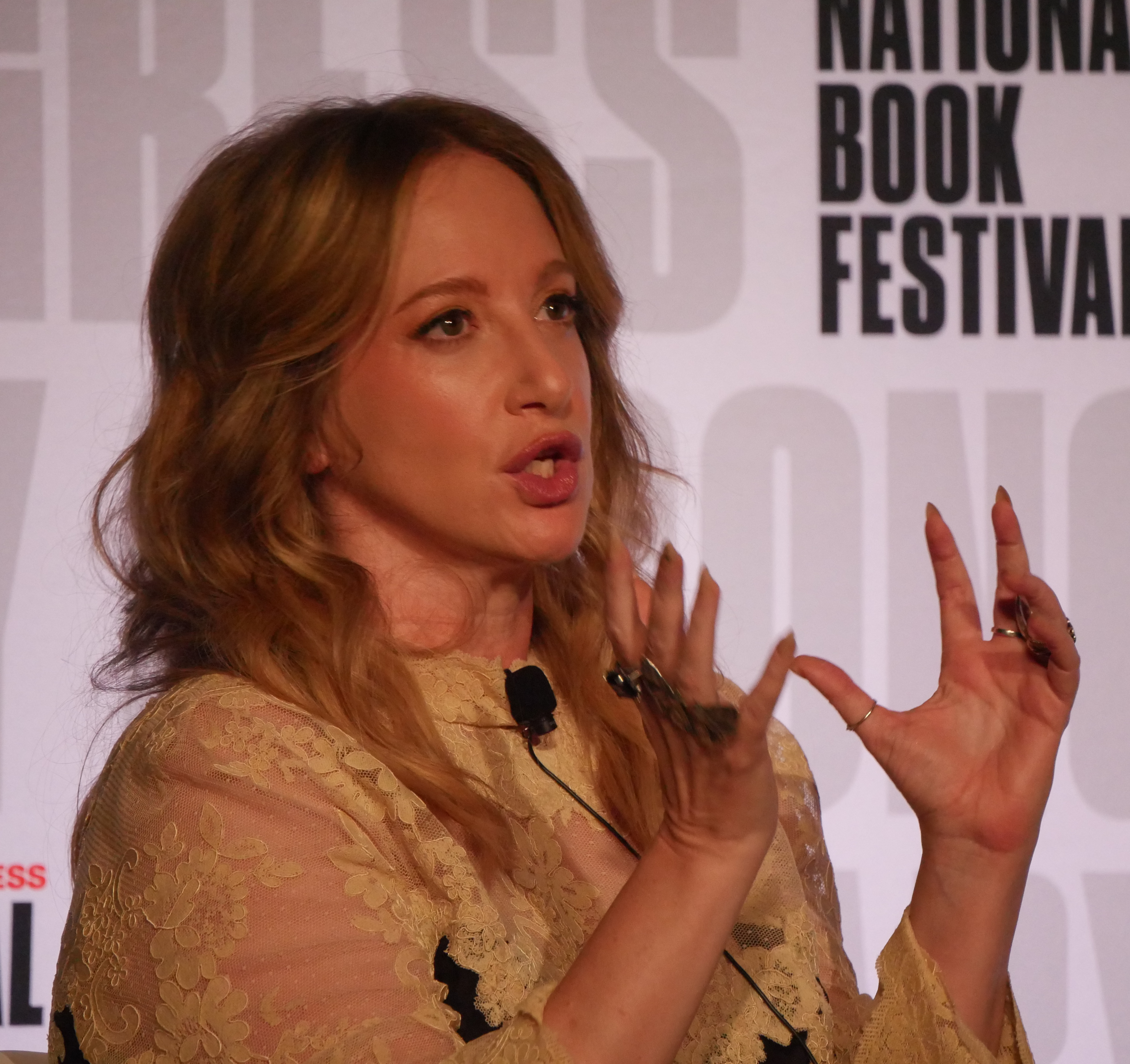
Leigh Bardugo

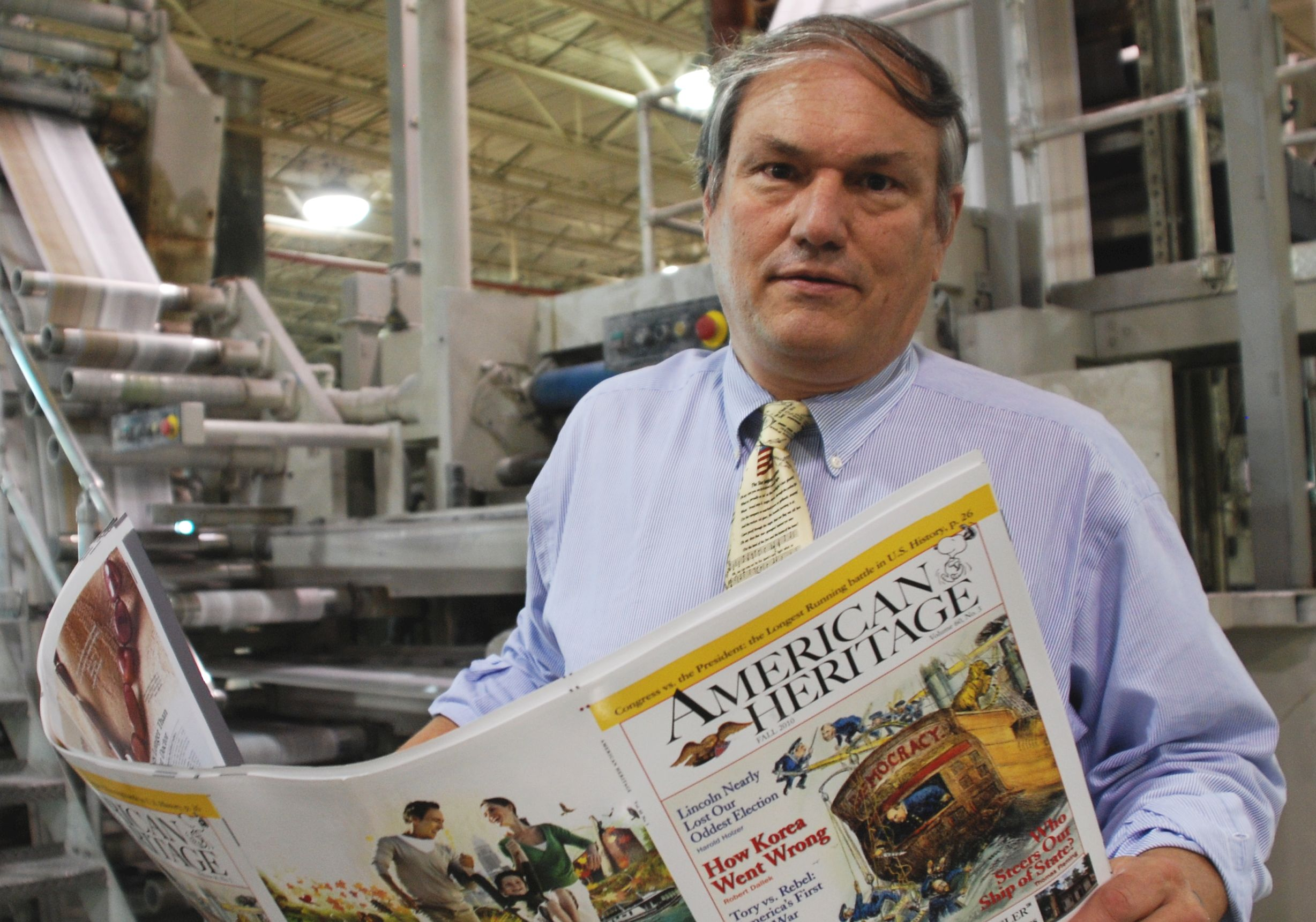
Edwin S. Grosvenor

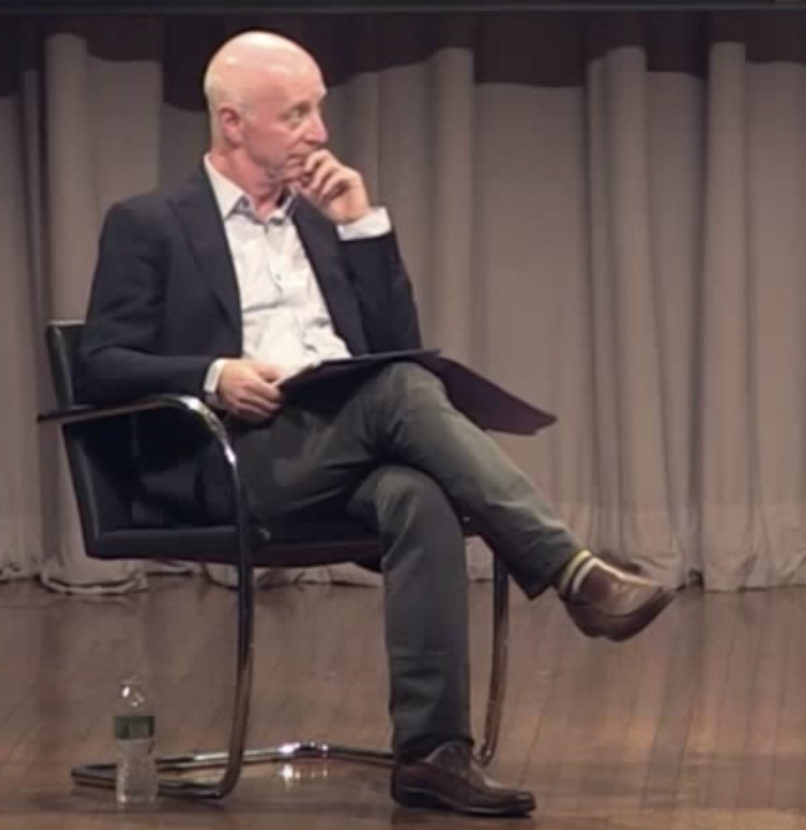
Paul Goldberger

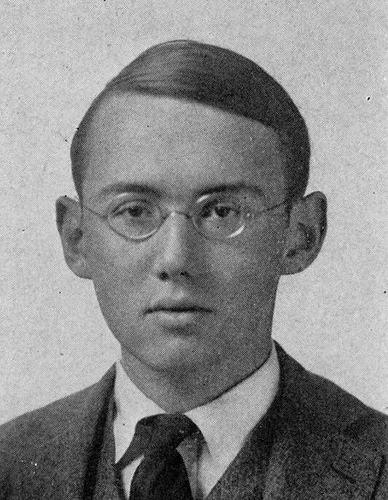
Stephen Vincent Benét

Name	Yale class	Notability	Ref.
John Williams Andrews	1920	Poet, journalist, lawyer, and public relations professional; chief of the Federal-State Relations Section of United States Justice Department; co-recipient of the Robert Frost Poetry Award	
Leigh Bardugo	1997	Israeli–American fantasy author, known for young adult Grishaverse novels	
Charles L. Bartlett	1943	Pulitzer Prize-winning journalist	
Stephen Vincent Benét	1919	Pulitzer Prize-winning poet, short story writer, and novelist	
William Henry Bishop	1867	Novelist	
Clarence Winthrop Bowen	1883	Journalist for the New York Herald Tribune, inherited The Independent	
Paul Goldberger	1972	Pulitzer Prize for Distinguished Criticism, editor at Vanity Fair, and architectural critic for The New York Times	
Barry Golson	1967	Executive editor of Playboy magazine and TV Guide; editor-in-chief of World Press Review	
Edwin S. Grosvenor	1974	President and editor-in-chief of American Heritage	
Cyril Hume	1922	Screenwriter, known for Tarzan the Ape Man, Flying Down to Rio, The Great Gatsby, and Forbidden Planet	
Crosby Kemper III	1974	Library executive, former director of the Institute of Museum and Library Services	
John Leggett	1942	Writer, editor, and longtime director of the Iowa Writers' Workshop	
George Gould Lincoln	1902	Political journalist for the Washington Evening Star and recipient of the Presidential Medal of Freedom	
William Matthews	1965	Poet and essayist, winner of the Ruth Lilly Poetry Prize	
Charles "Chip" McGrath	1968	Editor of The New York Times Book Review, writer and editor for The New Yorker	
Walter Millis	1920	Writer for the New York Herald Tribune	
William Lyon Phelps	1884	Author, critic, and scholar	
Paul Preuss	1966	Science fiction author and science writer, known for the Venus Prime series	
Sanjena Sathian	2013	Novelist and journalist	
Preston Schoyer	1933	Novelist	
Edmund Clarence Stedman	1849	Poet, critic, essayist, banker, and scientist	
Henry Raup Wagner	1884	Author, bibliographer, cartographer, and book collector	
Ben Zimmer	1992	Linguist, lexicographer, language columnist for The Wall Street Journal	

== Medicine and science ==
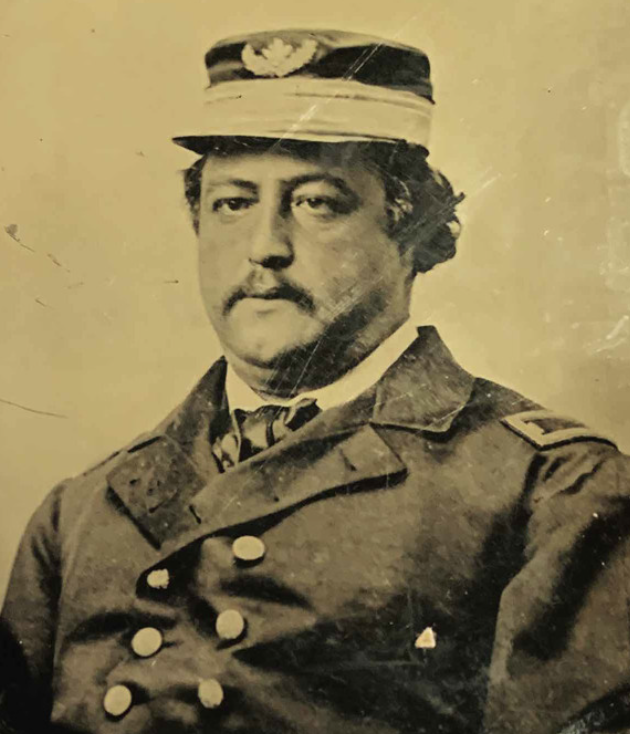
Richard Henry Greene

Name	Yale class	Notability	Ref.
Joseph Augustus Blake	1885	Surgeon, professor of surgery at Columbia University, World War I surgeon-in-chief	
George F. Cahill Jr.	1947	Physician-scientist known for major research on diabetes, fasting, and metabolism	
Henry Strong Durand	1881	Physician, creator of Bright College Years, and donor of Durand Eastman Park	
James Glynn Gregory	1865	Physician, surgeon general of Connecticut, Connecticut House of Representatives member	
Rhiana Gunn-Wright	2011	Climate policy director at the Roosevelt Institute	
Alfred Hand Jr.	1888	Pediatrician, professor of pediatrics at the University of Pennsylvania, discoverer of Hand-Schüller-Christian disease	
C. William Hanson	1977	Physician, medical informatics researcher, and Penn health system CMIO	
Robert Forbes Hawkes	1887	Physician and surgeon specializing in gynecology and abdominal surgery, prominent in Gilded Age New York	
David Hilfiker	1967	Physician, founded recovery shelters and hospices, authored books on medical errors	
Charles Lawrance	1905	Founder of Lawrance Aero Engine Company, early proponent of air-cooled aircraft engines	
Douglas B. McGill	1951	President of the American Gastroenterological Association and chair of Mayo Clinic	
Clark Blanchard Millikan	1924	Co-founder of the National Academy of Engineering, and distinguished professor of aeronautics at the California Institute of Technology	
Stephen A. Mitchell	1968	Psychoanalyst and leading founder of the relational psychoanalysis movement	
William G. Nelson	1980	Oncologist and prostate cancer researcher; director of a Johns Hopkins cancer center	
Eli Newberger	1962	Pediatrician, pioneer in child abuse field, educator, author, and jazz musician	
Theresa Oei	2015	Biomedical researcher and former National Football League cheerleader for the New England Patriots	

== Politics ==
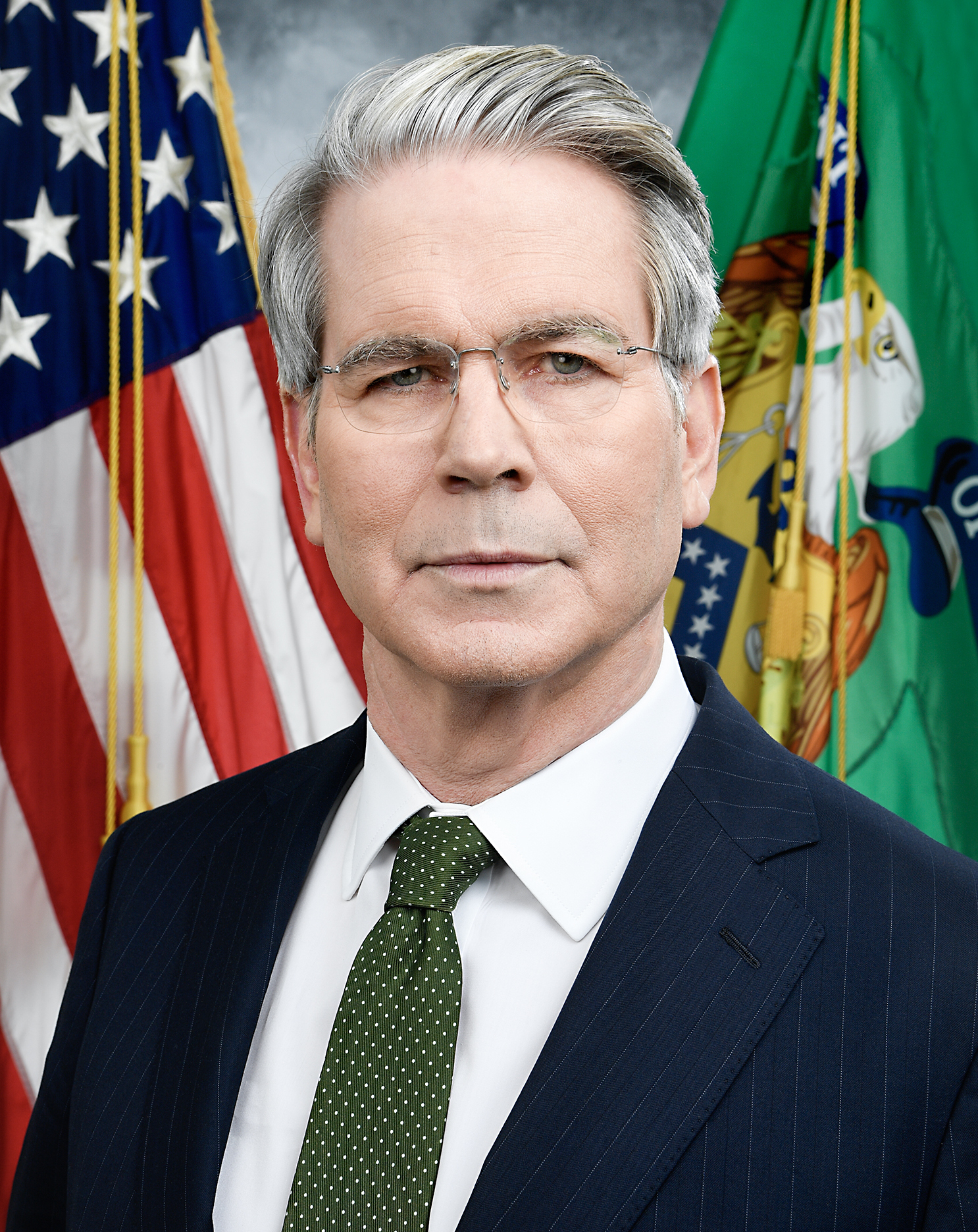
Scott Bessent

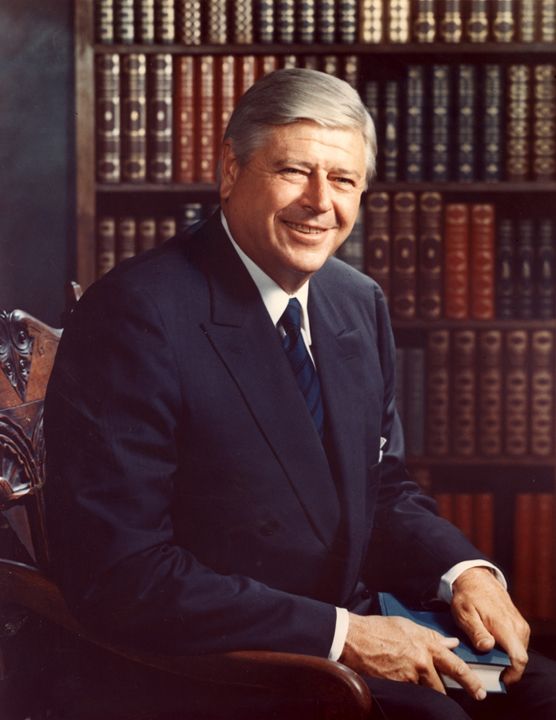
Rogers Morton

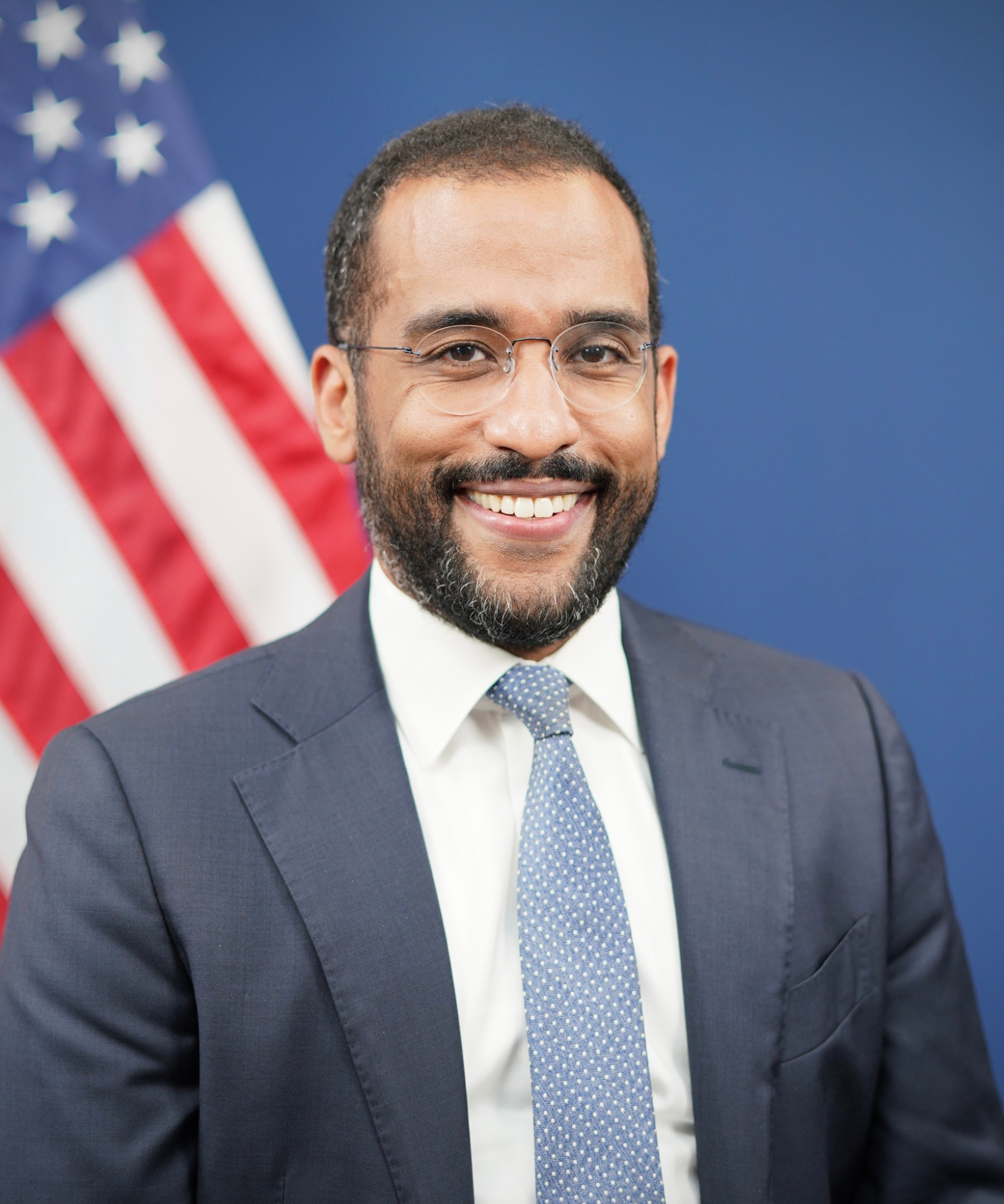
Yohannes Abraham

Name	Yale class	Notability	Ref.
Yohannes Abraham	2007	Chief of staff of the National Security Council and U.S. representative to the Association of Southeast Asian Nations	
Philip K. Allen	1933	Chairman of the Massachusetts Republican State Committee	
Malcolm Baldrige Jr.	1944	26th United States secretary of commerce, inducted into the ProRodeo Hall of Fame	
Scott Bessent	1984	79th United States secretary of the treasury	
Herbert Wolcott Bowen	1878	United States Ambassador to Venezuela and consul-general in Spain and Iran	
Simeon Baldwin Chittenden	1836	U.S. representative from New York's 3rd district	
Edwin Corning	1906	Lieutenant governor of New York, chairman of the New York State Democratic Committee	
Erastus Corning 2nd	1932	Mayor of Albany, New York; New York Senate; and New York State Assembly	
Parker Corning	1895	U.S. representative	
Mark Dayton	1969	Governor of Minnesota and U.S. senator	
Richard M. Fairbanks	1963	17th assistant secretary of state for legislative affairs	
Robert E. De Forest	1867	U.S. representative, mayor of Bridgeport, Connecticut senator	
Lafayette Blanchard Gleason	1885	Secretary of the New York Republican State Committee, secretary of Republican National Conventions	
Joseph N. Greene	1941	Diplomat and Foreign Service officer; headed the U.S. Interests Section in Cairo	
Robert Stockwell Reynolds Hitt	1898	U.S. minister to Panama and Guatemala	
Garentina Kraja	2011	Political adviser to Atifete Jahjaga, president of Kosovo	
Douglas MacArthur II	1932	United States ambassador to Japan, Belgium, Austria, and Iran; assistant secretary of state for legislative affairs	
Slade Mead	1984	Arizona state senator for the 20th district, vice-chairman of the Education Committee	
Edwin Albert Merritt	1884	U.S. representative from New York	
John Hill Morgan	1893	New York State Assembly	
Rogers Morton	1937	United States secretary of the interior, United States secretary of commerce, and U.S. representative	
Thruston Ballard Morton	1929	U.S. senator and U.S. representative from Kentucky	
Amasa J. Parker Jr.	1891	New York senator and major general of the National Guard	
Norman Paul	1940	U.S. defense official and former under secretary of the Air Force	
Hugh Price	1960	Intelligence officer and former CIA deputy director for operations	
A. Heaton Robertson	1872	Connecticut state senator, state representative, and Democratic nominee for governor of Connecticut	
Geoffrey Robinson	1960	Member of Parliament and paymaster general	
Kurt Schmoke	1971	47th mayor of Baltimore, Maryland; dean of the Howard University School of Law	
Raymond G.H. Seitz	1963	U.S. ambassador to the United Kingdom	
Stephen Sherrill	2009	San Francisco Board of Supervisors	
Lispenard Stewart	1876	New York state senator, president of the New York State Prison Commission, and philanthropist	
William Drew Washburn Jr.	1888	Railroad and real estate businessman, served multiple terms in the Minnesota House of Representatives	
William Egbert Wheeler	1866	Politician in the New York State Assembly, lumber manufacturer, and oil producer	

== Religion ==
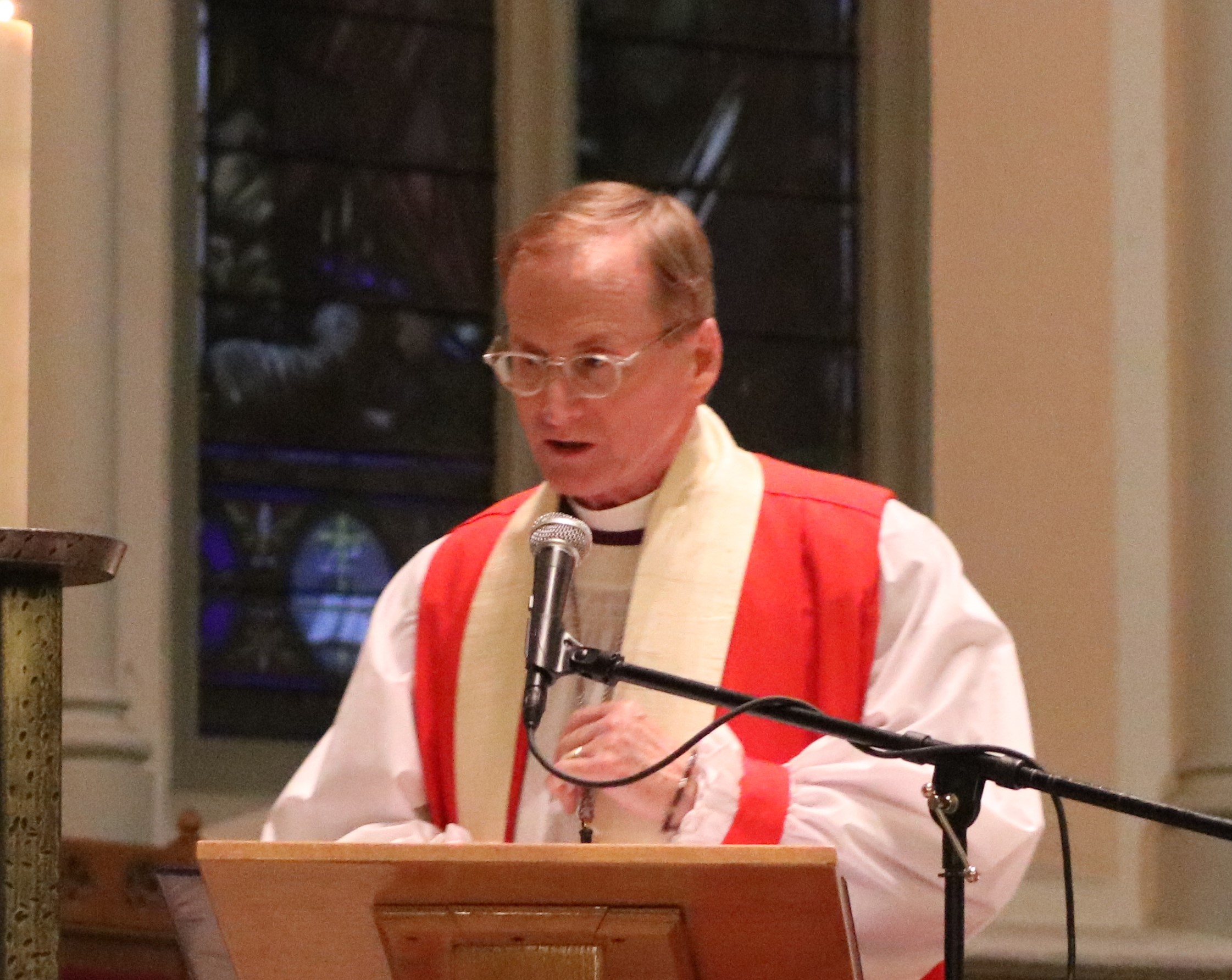
Dorsey McConnell

Name	Yale class	Notability	Ref.
Dorsey W. M. McConnell	1975	Acting bishop of Aberdeen and Orkney in the Scottish Episcopal Church	
Scotty McLennan	1970	Unitarian Universalist minister, lawyer, author, and Stanford academic	
Paul Moore Jr.	1941	Episcopal bishop of New York	

== Sports ==
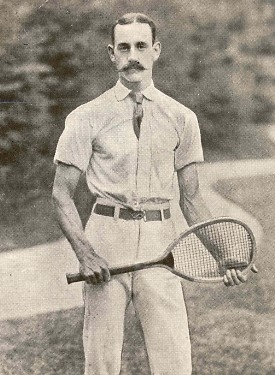
Henry Slocum

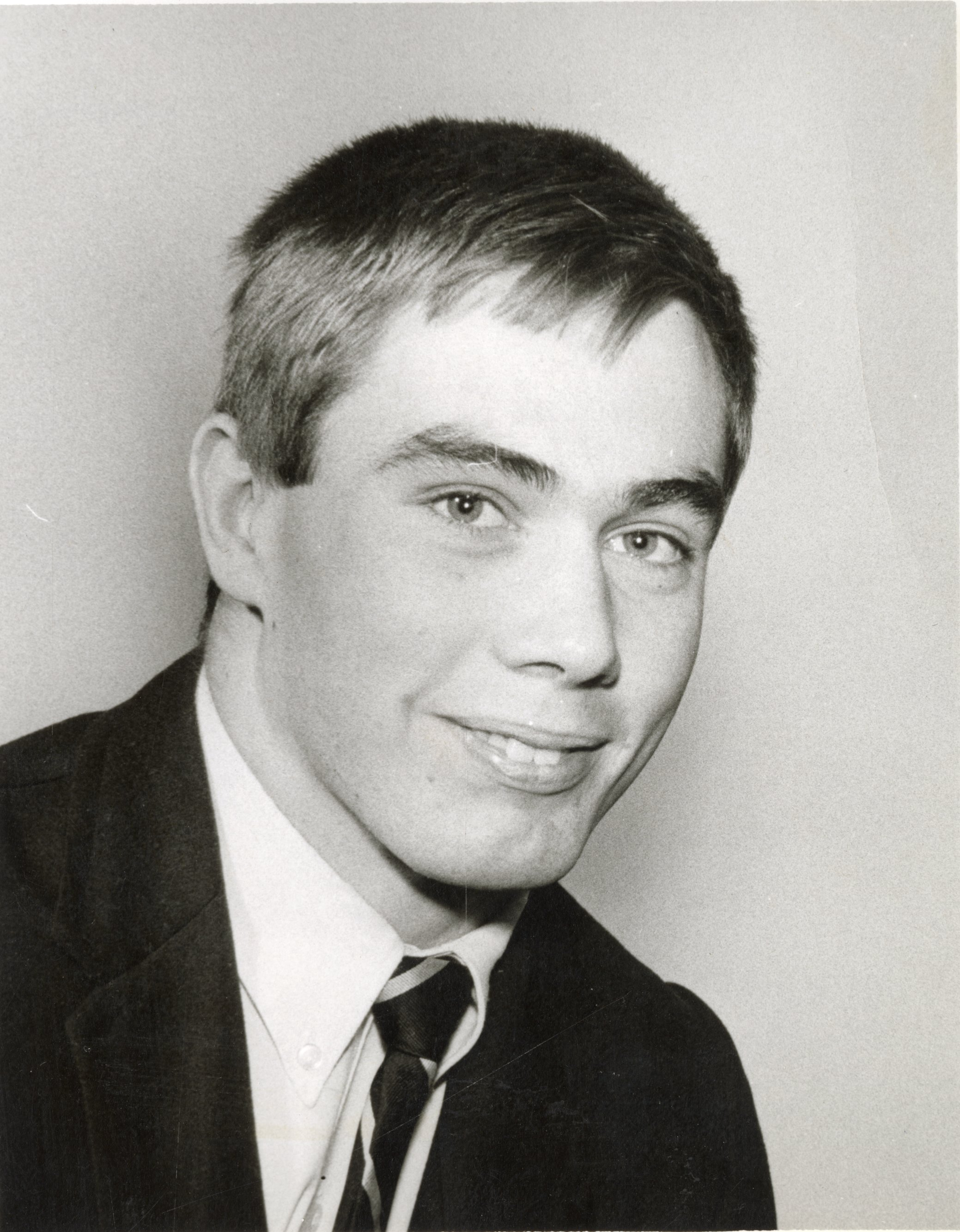
Dick Jauron

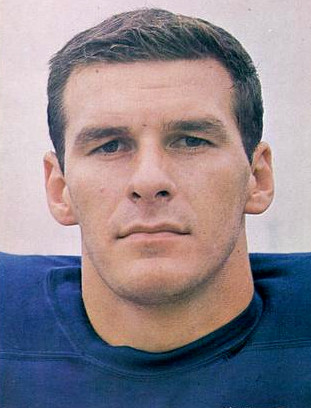
Chuck Mercein

Name	Yale class	Notability	Ref.
Donald Beer	1957	Competition rower and Olympic champion	
Nicole Breault	1994	Sailor, four-time winner of the U.S. Women's Open Championship	
Eben Byers	1902	U.S. Amateur golf champion, industrialist, socialite	
John Charlesworth	1929	College football player	
Thomas Charlton	1956	Competition rower and Olympic champion	
Alan Corey Jr.	1940	Polo player, five-time U.S. Open winner, Polo Hall of Fame inductee	
Morris Ely	1898	Football quarterback, head football coach at Williams College, New York lawyer	
Chuck Garland	1920	Champion of Wimbledon doubles and inducted into the International Tennis Hall of Fame	
Tess Gerrand	2011	Australian Olympic rower and medallist at World Rowing Cups	
Arthur Havemeyer	1904	Golfer, competed in 1904 Olympic tournament and U.S. Amateur	
Reuben A. Holden III	1911	Tennis player	
Charles P. Howland	1891	First head football coach at Brown University later a lawyer	
Dick Jauron	1973	Professional football player and head coach of the Chicago Bears and Buffalo Bills	
Kieran Locke	2006	Professional swimmer for the United States Virgin Islands	
Chuck Mercein	1965	Professional football player for the New York Giants, the Green Bay Packers, and the New York Jets	
John Alston Moorhead	1904	Football player, head coach of University of Pittsburgh	
Jack Morrison	1967	Ice hockey Olympic athlete and corporate manager	
Ducky Pond	1925	College football player and head fo coach at Yale University	
Michelle Quibell	2006	Two-time squash NCAA Division 1 Champion	
Henry Slocum	1883	U.S. Open tennis champion, president of the United States National Lawn Tennis Association, International Tennis Hall of Fame inductee	
Stanley Blewett Wagoner	1913	United States pole vault champion, Yale track captain	
Rusty Wailes	1958	Gold medal Summer Olympics rower	
