= Mildred C. Hailey =

American community activist

- Born: 1933; Jackson, Mississippi
- Died: 2016 (aged 82–83)
- Occupation: Community activist

Mildred C. Hailey née Younger (1933–2016) was an American community activist.

== Early life ==
Hailey was born in Jackson, Mississippi. Her family moved to Boston when her father got a job at the Charleston Naval Shipyard during World War II.

== Career ==
After getting married in 1951 and moving to Jamaica Plain, Hailey and Anna Mae Cole, among others, started the first tenant management corporation (TMC) in the nation at the Bromley-Heath public housing development in 1971. Hailey was the executive direction of the TMC. The tenant management corporation ran its own security force and community radio. Hailey retired from the corporation in 2012.

== Legacy ==
In 2016, the Bromley-Heath apartments were renamed the Mildred C. Hailey apartment after Hailey. Hailey was interviewed by Karilyn Crockett for Crockett's book, People Before Highways: Boston Activists, Urban Planners, and a New Movement for City Making. In 2023, she was recognized as one of "Boston's most admired, beloved, and successful Black Women leaders" by the Black Women Lead project.
