= Anna Mae Cole =

American public housing activist

- Occupation: Housing activist
- Organization: Bromley-Heath Tenant Management Corporation

Anna Mae Cole is a public housing activist in the Jamaica Plain neighborhood of Boston, Massachusetts.

Cole was a founding board member and the chairman of the tenant management corporation at the Bromley-Heath public housing development in Jamaica Plain established in 1971. The tenant management corporation was the first of its kind in the nation. Cole and the tenant management corporation created a radio station broadcasting exclusively to Bromley Heath residents in 1972. Cole was also a member of the first resident advisory board at the Boston Housing Authority. Cole regularly worked with Mildred C. Hailey, another housing activist, to ensure fair conditions for public housing residents.

Cole was interviewed for the redevelopment of the Mission Extension and Bromley Heath housing project as a former tenant. Cole was a delegate to the National Democratic Party convention representing the 9th congressional district in 1972. Cole narrated a 1978 documentary on the Mission Hill neighborhood and the Bromley-Health public housing development.

The Anna Mae Cole Community Center at the Bromley-Heath public housing development was named after her. The Black Panther Party set up a Breakfast program at the center in 1970.

In 2023, she was recognized as one of "Boston’s most admired, beloved, and successful Black Women leaders" by the Black Women Lead project.
