= George Grant Mason Jr. =

G. Grant Mason Jr.
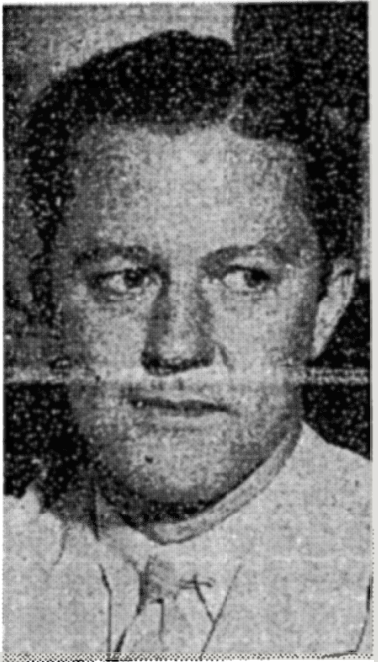
- Born: George Grant Mason Jr. January 2, 1904; Mason City, Iowa, U.S.
- Died: October 16, 1970 (aged 66)
- Education: Yale University; Guggenheim School of Aviation, New York University
- Occupations: Financier, aviation executive, civil aviation regulator, arbitration official
- Known for: Incorporator of Pan American Airways; member of the Civil Aeronautics Authority and Civil Aeronautics Board
- Spouse(s): Jane Kendall Mason; Martha Ashley McMakin

George Grant Mason Jr. (January 2, 1904 - October 16, 1970), generally known as G. Grant Mason Jr., was an American financier, aviation executive, civil aviation regulator, and arbitration official. He was one of the founder of the original Pan American Airways in 1927 and later served as the airline's Caribbean representative. In 1938, President Franklin D. Roosevelt appointed Mason to the newly created Civil Aeronautics Authority, and he later served on the Civil Aeronautics Board.

Mason was also active in aviation planning before and during World War II, including interdepartmental work on Western Hemisphere aviation and service in the United States Army Air Forces. In later life he held leadership positions in the American Arbitration Association, serving as its president, chairman, and vice chairman.

== Early life and education ==
Mason was born in Mason City, Iowa, on January 2, 1904, the son of George Grant Mason and Marion Peak Mason. He was educated at the Browning School in New York, St. Paul's School in Concord, New Hampshire, and Yale University, where he received a Bachelor of Arts degree in 1926. He then studied at the Guggenheim School of Aviation at New York University from 1926 to 1927.

While at Yale, Mason published Bingo's Book, a short illustrated humor book issued in New Haven in 1926. Yale's 1926 yearbook also listed him among the members of Alpha Delta Phi and Wolf's Head Society.

== Pan American Airways ==
Mason became involved in aviation shortly after college. In 1927, the original Pan American Airways was incorporated by investors John K. Montgomery, Richard Bevier, and S. S. Colt. The venture emerged amid American strategic concern about foreign aviation influence in Latin America and the defense of the Panama Canal. Later in 1927, Pan American received a temporary United States foreign air-mail contract for service to Cuba, known as FAM 4, and began preparing landing arrangements in Key West and Havana.

Robert Daley's history of Pan American Airways describes Mason as one of the early financial and social backers of the project and states that he traveled with Montgomery to Cuba while the company sought official permissions for operations there. On October 11, 1927, the original corporation became part of a new corporate structure led by Juan Trippe, and Pan American flew its first mail to Havana later that month.

Mason remained associated with Pan American during its early Caribbean expansion. A biographical directory describes him as the company's representative before twenty one Caribbean governments, with headquarters in Havana, from 1927 to 1938. It also lists him as president and general manager of the Compañía Nacional Cubana de Aviación from 1933 to 1938. When Time reported his 1938 appointment to the Civil Aeronautics Authority, it described him as Pan American's foreign representative in charge of Caribbean service.

== Civil Aeronautics Authority and Civil Aeronautics Board ==
In 1938, Mason was appointed to the newly created Civil Aeronautics Authority. Time described him as the only airline executive named to the body and noted that he was thirty-four years old at the time of his appointment. The United States Senate confirmed his nomination to the Civil Aeronautics Authority in early 1939.

The new federal aviation system was created under the Civil Aeronautics Act of 1938, which reorganized federal oversight of air transport, safety, and accident investigation. Mason's work included air-transport policy and accident investigation. In 1941, he was designated as one of the members of the Civil Aeronautics Board to preside at the public hearing into the crash of Transcontinental & Western Air Flight 6 near St. Louis.

Mason also participated in prewar aviation planning for the Western Hemisphere. In 1939, after President Roosevelt called for an aviation-expansion plan for Latin America, an interdepartmental committee was established with Mason, then of the Civil Aeronautics Authority, as chairman. The committee included representatives of the War, Navy, and State departments and produced a plan approved in 1939.

== World War II service and air-transport planning ==
During World War II, Mason served in the United States Army Air Forces. A United States Air Force history of the Civil Reserve Air Fleet identifies him in 1942 as Lieutenant Colonel G. Grant Mason Jr., executive officer of the Air Transport Command's plans division, and notes his prior service with the Civil Aeronautics Authority.

In 1942, General Harold L. George appointed Mason, Colonel Harold R. Harris, and Major Samuel E. Gates to a committee studying the future of American air transport. The committee's preliminary report addressed postwar questions about public and private operation, monopoly and competition, feeder services, and international aviation rights. Mason was also listed as a United States delegate to the Quadrant Conference in Quebec in August 1943.

== Business, arbitration, and later career ==
Before entering aviation, Mason worked in the new-business department of the Corn Exchange Bank in New York in 1925. Later in his business career, he was associated with Alloy Products, Inc., of Baton Rouge, Louisiana, and served as chairman of Versfelt.

Mason became active in arbitration and international commercial dispute resolution. He was a member of the United States committee of the Inter-American Arbitration Commission in 1958. He served as a director of the American Arbitration Association beginning in 1956, joined its executive committee in 1957, chaired its membership committee from 1958 to 1960, and served successively as president from 1960 to 1962, chairman from 1962 to 1965, and vice chairman from 1965.

== Art, collecting, and literary connections ==
Mason had an early interest in art and illustration, reflected in his 1926 book Bingo's Book. The National Gallery of Art identifies him as the donor of Sir Thomas Lawrence's 1823 Portrait of the Marquess of Hertford, which entered the museum's collection in 1968.

During his marriage to Jane Kendall Mason, Mason was connected with the social and literary circle around Ernest Hemingway. The Letters of Ernest Hemingway includes a 1932 letter addressed to Jane and Grant Mason.

== Personal life ==
Mason married Jane Kendall in June 1927. The marriage ended in divorce in 1940. He married Martha Ashley McMakin in May 1946; that marriage ended in divorce in November 1968.

Mason died on October 16, 1970, at the age of 66.

== Selected works ==
- Mason, George Grant Jr. (1926). Bingo's Book. New Haven: Tuttle, Morehouse & Taylor.

== See also ==
- Pan American World Airways
- Civil Aeronautics Board
- Air Transport Command
- American Arbitration Association
- Jane Kendall Mason
