= John Hamilton (Kansas politician) =

American politician

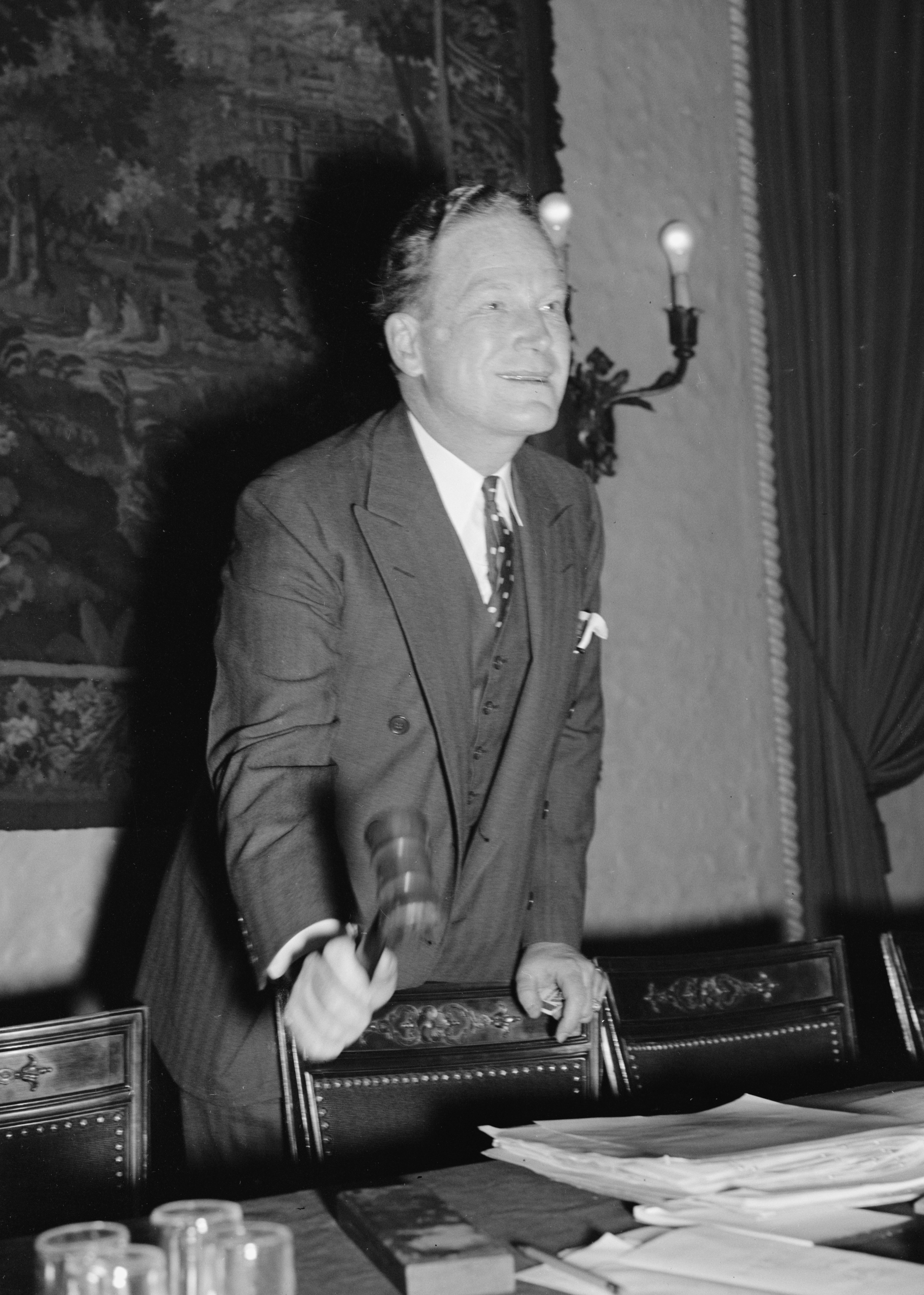
- Hamilton opening the 1933 Republican National Committee meeting

Chair of the Republican National Committee
- In office June 22, 1936 – July 8, 1940
- Preceded by: Henry P. Fletcher
- Succeeded by: Joseph W. Martin Jr.

Personal details
- Born: John Daniel Miller Hamilton; March 2, 1892 Fort Madison, Iowa, U.S.
- Died: September 24, 1973 (aged 81) Clearwater, Florida, U.S.
- Party: Republican
- Education: Northwestern University (LLB)

John Daniel Miller Hamilton (March 2, 1892 – September 24, 1973) was an American Republican politician from the U.S. state of Kansas.

Hamilton was raised in Topeka, Kansas, where his father was general counsel of the Atchison, Topeka and Santa Fe Railroad. His elder brother was actor Hale Hamilton. Upon graduation from preparatory school in 1913, he stopped in Chicago to see his father's friend, Dean Wigmore, who promptly invited him to enroll in Northwestern University Law School.

Hamilton went on to become Speaker of the Kansas House of Representatives for the 1927 Session and 1928 Special Session. He lost the Republican Governor primary election to Clyde Reed in 1928. In the 1930 Republican Governor primary he was the campaign manager for Frank Hauke who defeated incumbent Governor Clyde Reed, but lost in the general election. As Hauke's campaign manager, Hamilton was also made Chairman of the Kansas Republican Party from 1930 to 1932, In November 1932, following the death of Kansas Republican National Committeeman David Mulvane, Governor Alf Landon had Hamilton elected as the new Kansas Republican National Committeeman for Kansas, a role he filled from 1932 to 1940. In 1936, following the nomination of then-Governor Alf Landon to run against President Franklin D. Roosevelt, Hamilton was appointed chairman of the Republican National Committee. His picture was on Time's cover on September 23, 1936. Landon lost the election in a landslide, but Hamilton continued as chairman of the Republican National Committee until 1940, due in large part to the considerable help of a freshman Illinois congressman, Everett Dirksen, whose eloquent support turned back several efforts to replace Hamilton.

Hamilton personally visited 3,000 GOP county chairmen during his four-year term, and, in the process, eliminated the huge Landon campaign debt. Hamilton presided at the 1940 Republican National Convention that nominated Wendell Willkie to run against Roosevelt. When, according to well-established custom, Willkie picked his own national party chairman, Hamilton retired from active politics.

In 1940, Hamilton at the age of 48 resigned from the RNC and two days later married Jane Kendall Mason, 30, who a month earlier divorced George Grant Mason Jr., member of the Civil Aeronautics Board in Tampa, Florida. According to former first lady Grace Coolidge, Jane Kendall was "the most beautiful debutante who ever entered the White House".

At the suggestion of members of the Pew family, he relocated to Philadelphia rather than returning to Kansas and joined the Pepper Law Firm. While in private practice, he continued to follow political developments and frequency recounted political anecdotes to colleagues who gathered in his office to listen.

Hamilton received national and international attention in 1950, when he was appointed to represent Harry Gold, a Philadelphia chemist and confessed courier in the Julius and Ethel Rosenberg network that passed atomic secrets to the Soviet Union. In 1955 he became chairman of the Pepper Law Firm and resigned the position in 1964.

Party political offices
Preceded by Henry P. Fletcher	Chair of the Republican National Committee; 1936–1940	Succeeded by Joseph W. Martin Jr.
