= Douglas B. McGill =

- Born: August 14, 1929; New York City, U.S.
- Died: February 21, 2004 (aged 74); Rochester, Minnesota, U.S.
- Education: Yale University; Tufts University School of Medicine
- Occupations: Physician, gastroenterologist, hepatologist, medical educator
- Employer: Mayo Clinic
- Known for: President of the American Gastroenterological Association; chair of Mayo Clinic's Division of Gastroenterology and Hepatology; research on liver disease, lactase deficiency, fecal occult blood testing, and nonalcoholic steatohepatitis
- Spouse: Jean Perkins McGill
- Children: 4

Douglas B. McGill (August 14, 1929 - February 21, 2004) was an American gastroenterologist, hepatologist, medical educator, and administrator at the Mayo Clinic. He was president of the American Gastroenterological Association (AGA) in 1986 and chaired Mayo Clinic's Division of Gastroenterology and Hepatology from 1974 to 1982.

McGill spent most of his career at Mayo Clinic in Rochester, Minnesota, where he was a physician, educator, researcher, and clinical administrator from 1958 until his death. His research and clinical publications covered liver disease, Dubin-Johnson syndrome, lactase deficiency, fecal occult blood testing, early colorectal cancer detection, liver biopsy complications, gastrointestinal blood loss, and nonalcoholic steatohepatitis. He was a co-author of the 1980 Mayo Clinic Proceedings article that introduced the term "nonalcoholic steatohepatitis" for a condition then described as a "hitherto unnamed disease".

== Early life and education ==
McGill was born in New York City on August 14, 1929. He was the only child of Earl McGill, a radio director, and Constance Brown McGill, who had worked in theater and later wrote drama, poetry, and fiction. He grew up in Manhattan and attended private schools in New York before attending Phillips Academy in Andover, Massachusetts.

McGill studied premedicine at Yale University, with academic interests that included psychology and political science, and graduated in 1951. While at Yale, he was a member of Wolf's Head Society, a senior society. He then attended Tufts University School of Medicine, graduating in 1955.

After medical school, McGill completed an internship at Boston City Hospital. He then served on active duty in the United States Army Medical Corps, spending two years as an Army physician in France.

== Mayo Clinic career ==
McGill moved to Rochester, Minnesota, in 1958 to train at the Mayo Clinic. He entered gastroenterology fellowship training at Mayo, where he worked with Jesse Bollman on bilirubin chemistry and metabolism. He joined Mayo Clinic's gastroenterology division as a consultant in 1961.

From 1974 to 1982, McGill chaired Mayo Clinic's Division of Gastroenterology and Hepatology. During his career at Mayo, he was active as a clinician, teacher, administrator, and researcher. His obituary in the Star Tribune described him as a Mayo physician, educator, and administrator since 1958 and reported that he published 89 peer-reviewed papers.

== Research ==
=== Liver disease and hepatology ===
McGill's research interests included several forms of liver disease. A later Mayo Clinic Alumni Association review listed among his major contributions work on the natural history, genetic features, and biochemical abnormalities of Dubin-Johnson syndrome, a hereditary disorder associated with conjugated hyperbilirubinemia. Earlier work by McGill and colleagues examined sulfobromophthalein metabolism in Dubin-Johnson syndrome.

In 1974, McGill and J. D. Motto reported an industrial outbreak of toxic hepatitis caused by methylenedianiline in The New England Journal of Medicine. His liver-related publications also addressed postoperative jaundice, hepatitis, methotrexate-associated liver injury, liver tumors, and complications of liver biopsy.

McGill was one of the four authors of "Nonalcoholic steatohepatitis: Mayo Clinic experiences with a hitherto unnamed disease", published in 1980 in Mayo Clinic Proceedings. The paper became a frequently cited early description of nonalcoholic steatohepatitis, often abbreviated NASH.

=== Lactase deficiency and carbohydrate malabsorption ===
McGill worked with Albert D. Newcomer and others on lactase deficiency and lactose tolerance. Their studies included work on lactose tolerance tests, the distribution of disaccharidase activity in the small bowel, and indirect methods of detecting lactase deficiency.

The Mayo Clinic Alumni Association's review credited McGill and Newcomer with characterizing lactase deficiency biochemically, analyzing its clinical significance, and validating new diagnostic tests. McGill was also a co-author of a 1977 Gastroenterology article describing lactase deficiency as a common genetic trait of the American Indian population studied by the authors.

=== Fecal occult blood testing and colorectal cancer detection ===
McGill contributed to research on fecal blood testing and colorectal cancer detection. In 1985, David A. Ahlquist, McGill, and colleagues published a New England Journal of Medicine study of fecal blood levels using HemoQuant, a quantitative test for fecal hemoglobin. The Mayo Clinic Alumni Association later identified HemoQuant work for occult fecal blood detection and early colorectal-cancer diagnosis as one of McGill's major areas of contribution.

McGill was also a co-author of a 1993 JAMA prospective study comparing Hemoccult and HemoQuant fecal occult blood tests for colorectal neoplasia.

== American Gastroenterological Association ==
McGill served as president of the American Gastroenterological Association in 1986. His AGA involvement began in 1973 with service on the Education and Training Committee, followed by the Manpower Task Force and the Legislative Liaison Committee. He later served as a councilor and member of the AGA governing board.

In addition to his AGA work, McGill served on committees of the American College of Physicians, including a subcommittee responsible for the gastroenterology section of the Medical Knowledge Self-Assessment Program.

== Personal life and death ==
McGill married Jean Perkins in Kennebunk, Maine, in 1953. They had four children. The family moved to Rochester, Minnesota, in 1958 when McGill joined Mayo Clinic as a resident.

McGill died in Rochester on February 21, 2004, at the age of 74. Gastroenterology reported that he died of viral pneumonia.

== Selected publications ==
- McGill, D. B.; Humpherys, S. R.; Baggenstoss, A. H.; Dickson, E. R. (November 1972). "Cirrhosis and death after jejunoileal shunt". Gastroenterology. 63 (5): 872–877. doi:10.1016/S0016-5085(19)33218-4. PMID 5079496.
- McGill, D. B.; Motto, J. D. (August 8, 1974). "An industrial outbreak of toxic hepatitis due to methylenedianiline". The New England Journal of Medicine. 291 (6): 278–282. doi:10.1056/NEJM197408082910604. PMID 4407276.
- McGill, D. B. (1985). "The president and the power of the colonoscope". Mayo Clinic Proceedings. 84 (2): 81. PMID 3974355.
- McGill, D. B. (December 1987). "The AGA rounds ninety and heads for one hundred". Gastroenterology. 93 (6): 1155–1158. doi:10.1016/0016-5085(87)90238-1. PMID 3315821.
- McGill, D. B.; Rakela, J.; Zinsmeister, A. R.; Ott, B. J. (November 1990). "A 21-year experience with major hemorrhage after percutaneous liver biopsy". Gastroenterology. 99 (5): 1396–1400. doi:10.1016/0016-5085(90)91167-5. PMID 2101588.

== See also ==
- American Gastroenterological Association
- Mayo Clinic
- Nonalcoholic steatohepatitis
- Lactose intolerance
- Fecal occult blood
- Wolf's Head Society
