= David Hilfiker =

American physician (born 1945)

- Born: February 12, 1945 (age 81); Buffalo, New York, U.S.
- Education: Yale University (BA); University of Minnesota Medical School (MD)
- Occupations: Physician, author, social justice advocate
- Known for: Writing on medical error; work with homeless and poor patients in Washington, D.C.; cofounding Christ House and Joseph's House
- Notable work: Healing the Wounds; Not All of Us Are Saints; Urban Injustice; "Facing Our Mistakes"
- Spouse: Marja Kaikkonen

David Hilfiker (born February 12, 1945) is an American physician, author, and social justice advocate. A family physician by training, he is known for his writing on medical error and for his work with poor and homeless patients in Washington, D.C. In the 1980s and 1990s he helped found Christ House, a medical recovery shelter for homeless people, and Joseph's House, a community and hospice for formerly homeless people with AIDS and cancer.

Hilfiker's 1984 essay "Facing Our Mistakes", published in The New England Journal of Medicine, became an influential account of physician error, guilt, and professional silence around mistakes. He later wrote the books Healing the Wounds: A Physician Looks at His Work, Not All of Us Are Saints: A Doctor's Journey with the Poor, and Urban Injustice: How Ghettos Happen.

== Early life and education ==
Hilfiker was born in Buffalo, New York, on February 12, 1945. His father was a clergyman, and later assessments of Hilfiker's work have described his Christian upbringing and faith as important influences on his choices in medicine and community service.

Hilfiker graduated from Yale College with a Bachelor of Arts degree in 1967 and received his medical degree from the University of Minnesota Medical School in 1974. He completed an internship in 1975 before entering family practice.

== Medical career ==
=== Rural Minnesota ===
From 1975 to 1982, Hilfiker practiced family medicine at the Cook County Community Clinic in Grand Marais, Minnesota. His experiences in rural practice later formed the basis for Healing the Wounds, a memoir and reflection on the emotional, ethical, and professional pressures of medical work.

After leaving the Minnesota practice, Hilfiker spent a sabbatical year in Finland from 1982 to 1983. He subsequently moved to Washington, D.C., where his work shifted toward medicine for poor, uninsured, and homeless patients.

=== Washington, D.C. ===
In 1983, Hilfiker began working at Community of Hope Health Services in Washington, D.C., where he provided care to low-income patients. According to the American Medical Association's Virtual Mentor, he spent seven years practicing in rural Minnesota and ten years in inner-city Washington.

Hilfiker helped found Christ House in 1985. The organization was described by the AMA as a 34-bed medical recovery shelter for homeless men. He and his family lived at Christ House for five years. Hilfiker later co-founded Joseph's House in 1990, a community and hospice for formerly homeless people with AIDS and cancer. He lived at Joseph's House for three years and served as its medical director, finance director, and a continuing member of the community.

== Writing and public thought ==
=== Medical error ===
Hilfiker's article "Facing Our Mistakes" was published in The New England Journal of Medicine in January 1984. In the essay, he described serious errors from his own medical practice and argued that physicians needed to acknowledge the emotional and moral consequences of mistakes rather than hide them behind professional silence. A 1986 Washington Post profile reported that journal editor Arnold Relman had telephoned Hilfiker before publication to give him an opportunity to withdraw the manuscript because of its unusual frankness.

The article attracted both criticism and support from physicians. In 2024, a retrospective article in Mayo Clinic Proceedings described "Facing Our Mistakes" and Healing the Wounds as ground-breaking contributions to discussion of clinician error and called Hilfiker's writing a "keystone of error discourse".

Hilfiker returned to the subject in later work, including the 2001 article "From the Victim's Point of View", published in the Journal of Medical Humanities.

=== Poverty medicine and homelessness ===
Hilfiker's second book, Not All of Us Are Saints: A Doctor's Journey with the Poor, was published by Hill and Wang in 1994. The book recounts his move from rural practice to inner-city medicine in Washington, D.C., and examines what Hilfiker called the practice of medicine among people living in poverty.

Review coverage summarized by Contemporary Authors described the book as an account of "poverty medicine" and noted that reviewers emphasized Hilfiker's willingness to examine both the hardships of poor patients and his own limits as a physician. The Lancet reviewer Reed V. Tuckson wrote that the book raised difficult questions for both physicians and the broader public. The book received a Christopher Award in 1994.

=== Urban poverty ===
Hilfiker's Urban Injustice: How Ghettos Happen was published by Seven Stories Press in 2002, with a foreword by Marian Wright Edelman. The book argues that concentrated urban poverty in the United States is produced by structural forces, including limited employment, inadequate health care and child care, poor schools, the criminal justice system, and the history of racial discrimination.

In 2006, Hilfiker was interviewed on the public radio program Speaking of Faith, later On Being, in an episode titled "Seeing Poverty After Katrina". The program connected his work on poverty and racial isolation to public questions raised after Hurricane Katrina. At the time, he was described as writing on the history of poverty, teaching at the Servant Leadership School, and continuing to work with Joseph's House.

== Cognitive impairment writing ==
In 2012, Hilfiker began writing publicly about a diagnosis of progressive mild cognitive impairment that was initially thought likely to be Alzheimer's disease. He wrote about the experience on the blog Watching the Lights Go Out and in essays for AgingCare.com. In October 2013, Hilfiker wrote that the diagnosis had been downgraded to "subjective cognitive complaints" and that Alzheimer's disease was then considered unlikely. He described the blog as an effort to reduce fear and embarrassment surrounding Alzheimer's disease and other cognitive impairments.

== Personal life ==
Hilfiker married Marja Kaikkonen, a teacher, on June 21, 1969. They have three children. He has lived in Washington, D.C., where he continued to write, teach, and lecture on poverty, politics, health care, and related issues.

== Selected bibliography ==
=== Books ===
- Hilfiker, David (1985). Healing the Wounds: A Physician Looks at His Work. New York: Pantheon Books. ISBN 9780394542836.
- Hilfiker, David (1994). Not All of Us Are Saints: A Doctor's Journey with the Poor. New York: Hill and Wang. ISBN 9780809039210.
- Hilfiker, David (2002). Urban Injustice: How Ghettos Happen. New York: Seven Stories Press. ISBN 9781583224656.

=== Articles and essays ===
- Hilfiker, David (March 24, 1983). "Allowing the Debilitated to Die - Facing Our Ethical Choices". The New England Journal of Medicine. 308 (12): 716–719. doi:10.1056/NEJM198303243081210.
- Hilfiker, David (January 12, 1984). "Facing Our Mistakes". The New England Journal of Medicine. 310 (2): 118–122. doi:10.1056/NEJM198401123100211.
- Hilfiker, David (December 2001). "From the Victim's Point of View". Journal of Medical Humanities. 22 (4): 255–263. doi:10.1023/A:1016654708975.

== Awards and honors ==
Hilfiker received a first-place trade-category award from the American Medical Writers Association in 1986. In 1994, he received a Christopher Award for Not All of Us Are Saints. In 2000, the American Medical Association's Virtual Mentor presented him with its award for his work with homeless patients with AIDS.
