= William Woolsey Johnson =

American mathematician

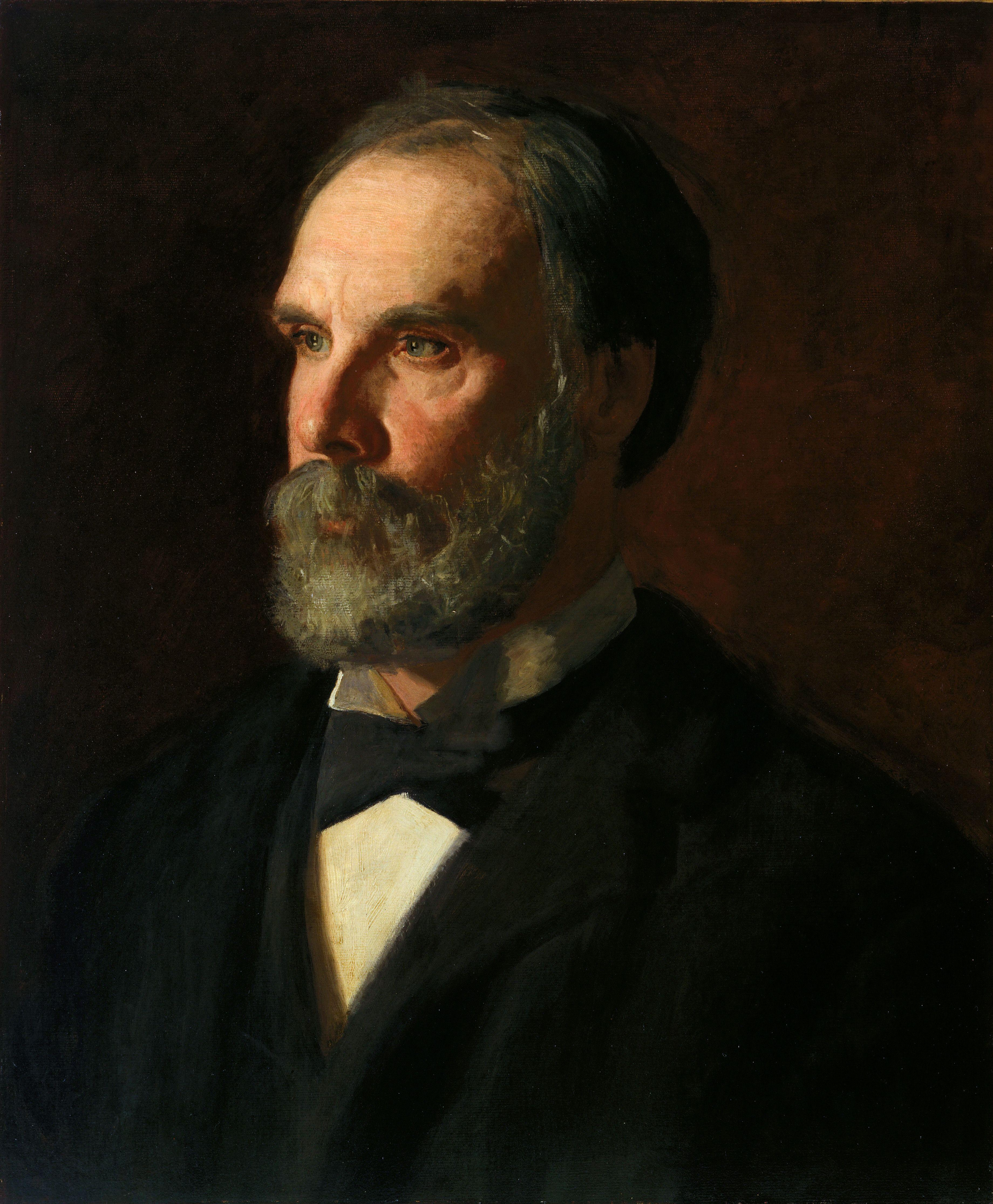
- Picture by Thomas Eakins
- Born: June 23, 1841; Owego (NY)
- Died: May 14, 1927 (aged 85); Baltimore (MD)
- Resting place: Woodlawn Cemetery (Baltimore); 39.325200°N 76.726093°W
- Education: Yale University
- Scientific career
- Fields: Mathematics
- Workplaces: United States Naval Academy; St. John's College; Kenyon College

William Woolsey Johnson (1841–1927) was an American mathematician, who was one of the founders of the American Mathematical Society.

== Life and work ==
Johnson, son of a farmer of Tioga County, New York, studied at Yale University where he received his BA in 1862. After two years serving in the Nautical Almanac Office in Cambridge, Massachusetts, he began his academic career as assistant professor in the Naval Academy in Newport, Rhode Island, but soon transferred to Annapolis, Maryland, from 1864 to 1869. In 1870 he was appointed professor of mathematics at Kenyon College and since 1872 at St. John's College (Annapolis). In 1881 he returned to the Naval Academy as full professor where he remained until his retirement in 1921.

He served as one of the five members of the Council of the American Mathematical Society for the 1892–1893 term and he was one of the impulsors of the birth of the Bulletin of the Society and one of his main first contributors.

Johnson is mainly remembered by his books on differential calculus, basing it on related rates. He is also known to be the first on probing the conditions of solvability of the 15 puzzle.

== Selected publications ==
=== Articles ===
- Johnson, W. Woolsey (1891). "Octonary numeration". Bull. Amer. Math. Soc. 1: 1–6. doi:10.1090/S0002-9904-1891-00015-2.
- Johnson, W. Woolsey (1892). "The mechanical axioms or laws of motion". Bull. Amer. Math. Soc. 1 (6): 129–139. doi:10.1090/S0002-9904-1892-00051-1.
- Johnson, W. Woolsey (1893). "On Peters's formula for probable error". Bull. Amer. Math. Soc. 2 (4): 57–61. doi:10.1090/S0002-9904-1893-00107-9.
- Johnson, W. Woolsey (1893). "A case of non-euclidian geometry". Bull. Amer. Math. Soc. 2 (7): 158–161. doi:10.1090/S0002-9904-1893-00130-4.
- Johnson, W. Woolsey (1894). "Gravitation and absolute units of force". Bull. Amer. Math. Soc. 3 (8): 197–199. doi:10.1090/S0002-9904-1894-00210-9.
- Johnson, W. Woolsey (1895). "Kinetic stability of central orbits". Bull. Amer. Math. Soc. 1 (8): 193–196. doi:10.1090/S0002-9904-1895-00272-4.
- Johnson, W. Woolsey (1906). "Note on the numerical transcendents S_{n} and s_{n} =S_{n-1}". Bull. Amer. Math. Soc. 12 (10): 477–482. doi:10.1090/S0002-9904-1906-01374-X.

=== Books ===
- A treatise on ordinary and partial differential equations. 1881. 3rd edition. 1893.
- An elementary treatise on the differential calculus, founded on the method of rates or fluxions. 1889.
- The theory of errors and method of least squares. 1893.
- Theoretical mechanics. An elementary treatise. 1901.

== Bibliography ==
- Austin, Bill; Barry, Don; Berman, David (2010). "The Lengthening Shadow: The Story of Related Rates". In Caren L. Diefenderfer; Roger B. Nelsen (eds.). The Calculus Collection: A Resource for AP and Beyond. Mathematical Association of America. pp. 139–148. ISBN 978-0-88385-761-8.
- Dwight, Benjamin Woodbridge (1874). The History of the Descendants of John Dwight of Dedham, Mass. John F. Trow & Son. pp. 298.
- Fiske, Thomas S. (2000). "Mathematical progress in America". Bulletin of the AMS. 37 (1): 3–8. doi:10.1090/S0273-0979-99-00799-5. ISSN 0273-0979. PMID 17781208.
- Hendrixson, Lisa Rose (2011). Variations of the 15 Puzzle. Ohio Link (Thesis).
