= Jane Kendall Mason =

American socialite

- Born: 1909
- Died: 1981 (aged 71–72)
- Occupations: Socialite, Outdoorswoman
- Known for: Inspiration for characters in Hemingway's novels
- Notable work: Resorting to Havana
- Spouse(s): George Grant Mason Jr. (m. 1927; div. 1940); John Daniel Miller Hamilton (m. 1940; div. 1954); Arnold Gingrich (m. 1955)
- Children: 2 adopted sons

Jane Kendall Mason Hamilton Abell Gingrich (1909 – 1981) was an American debutante, socialite, outdoorswoman, art collector and patron.

== Biography ==
Jane Kendall Gingrich was born Jane Welsh in 1909. A decade later, her mother Elizabeth, a divorcée who sang at private parties for members of New York City's upper class, began a relationship with the divorced Wall Street tycoon Lyman Kendall, who was worth an estimated $20 million. Kendall and her mother married, and he legally adopted the young Jane. The family moved to Tuxedo Park, New York and maintained residences in Miami and Washington, D.C., and sailed to Europe for extended stays.

Jane Kendall Gingrich was educated at exclusive private schools, where she showed promise in drawing and sculpture, and competed as an equestrian at Madison Square Garden. In her teenage years, the family lived at Kentsdale, an 1,000 acre estate near Potomac, Maryland, and were members of the Congressional Country Club.

When she was seventeen years old, she was presented as a debutante at two different balls in Washington, D.C. She modelled in advertisements for Pond's cold cream. Former U.S. First Lady Grace Coolidge referred to Jane Kendall as "the most beautiful debutante who ever entered the White House." American portraitist Howard Chandler Christy called her "one of the very best types of American girl."

In 1927, at the age of eighteen, she married George Grant Mason, Jr. in an elaborate society wedding at her family's estate. Mason, a graduate of Yale University, was from a wealthy family and served as head of Pan-American Airways' Caribbean operations in Cuba. The Masons moved to Jaimanitas, a large estate west of Havana that was staffed by nine servants. It was here that Jane Kendall Gingrich became known for hosting parties and attending events at clubs, casinos, and horse races.

In September 1931 the Masons met Ernest Hemingway and his wife, Pauline Pfeiffer, while sailing on the SS Île de France.

Ernest Hemingway, with whom she became close friends, referred to her as "about the most uninhibited person I ever met." He also claimed to have had an affair with her, which she always denied; perhaps in retribution, he wrote her into his fiction in unflattering ways. He based the characters Richard Bradley and Helène Bradley in To Have and Have Not on the Masons. He also based the character Margot Macomber in The Short Happy Life of Francis Macomber on Jane.

In the 1930s, Jane Kendall Mason developed a friendship with the American sculptor Isamu Noguchi, who carved her bust in ebony. She also owned a cast of his bronze sculpture Glad Day.

In 1932, she wrote an article titled Resorting to Havana for Vogue.

She survived a suicide attempt in 1933, jumping off the balcony at her Cuban residence, and underwent months of intensive psychotherapy.

Jane, who could not conceive children, adopted two British boys, and Hemingway was named the godfather of the elder son. She was an avid sportswoman and big game hunter, shooting elephants and rhinoceroses, and also went on big game fishing excursions. On a safari with Bror Blixen, she shot a zebra foal and had it made into a rocking horse for her children. In 1935, while on safari in East Africa, she developed a romantic relationship with Colonel Richard Cooper, a British officer who owned a coffee plantation in Tanganyika.

In 1940 she divorced George Grant Mason, Jr., who was a member of the Civil Aeronautics Board in Tampa, Florida. A month later she married Republican politician and lawyer John Daniel Miller Hamilton, two days after he resigned as executive director of the Republican National Committee. The couple moved to Chester County, Pennsylvania, where Jane Hamilton bought Willow Brook Farm and befriended the painter Horace Pippin, who was a national figure and local celebrity. She eventually owned nine works by him, eight of which she left to the Metropolitan Museum upon her death.

In the late 1940s, she married the newspaper columinist George Abell and moved to Paris. In 1955, she married Arnold Gingrich, a former flame. She and Gingrich lived at different residences in New York before settling in Ridgewood, New Jersey in 1962.

In 1964 she suffered a stroke that left her semi-invalid for the rest of her life. After the stroke, M.F.K. Fisher described her in a 1968 letter as "a hopeless and completely helpless paralytic and ex-alcoholic cared for like a rare orchid."

She died in 1981.
