= Theresa Oei =

American biomedial researcher and cheerleader

- Born: 1993 (age 32–33); Connecticut, U.S.
- Education: Yale University (BS); Harvard University (PhD)
- Known for: Biomedical research; New England Patriots cheerleading
- Scientific career
- Fields: Chemical biology, epigenetics, genetics
- Workplaces: Broad Institute; Harvard University; Massachusetts General Hospital
- Thesis: Investigating the Function of Canonical Polycomb Repressive Complex 1 Condensation (2024)

Theresa Oei is an American biomedical researcher and former National Football League cheerleader. Oei received regional and national media coverage in 2016 and 2017 for working in gene-editing research at the Broad Institute while also serving as a rookie cheerleader for the New England Patriots.

== Early life and education ==
Oei is from Hebron, Connecticut. As a middle-school student, she became a finalist in the 2006 Discovery Channel Young Scientist Challenge for an environmental-science project. A minor planet, 22784 Theresaoei, was later named for her; the naming citation identifies her as Theresa A. Oei, born in 1993, a finalist in the 2006 Discovery Channel Young Scientist Challenge who attended the Oei Home School in Hebron, Connecticut. The asteroid, provisionally designated 1999 JM43, is a main-belt asteroid discovered by the Lincoln Near-Earth Asteroid Research program.

In high school, Oei attended East Catholic High School in Manchester, Connecticut. In 2008, the Connecticut Academy of Science and Engineering listed her as the Connecticut Science Fair first-place winner in the senior division for physical sciences for a project titled "Use of Seashells to Detoxify Lead-Contaminated Effluent and Groundwater". The National Museum of Education later described her lead-removal project as an inexpensive filter using crushed seashells as the filtering medium. In 2011, the U.S. Department of Education listed Oei as one of Connecticut's U.S. Presidential Scholars.

Oei graduated from Yale University in 2015 with a degree in molecular biophysics and biochemistry. At Yale, she wrote for the Yale Scientific Magazine, including articles on rare genetic diseases, Ebola, star formation, and other research topics. Yale College Arts records also list her participation in dance and performance productions as a choreographer, director, producer, and performer between 2012 and 2015. In 2015, Oei was elected into the Wolf's Head Society.

== Scientific career ==
=== Yale and Broad Institute ===
As an undergraduate at Yale, Oei co-authored a 2015 Journal of Virology article on microRNAs encoded by Herpesvirus saimiri.

After graduating from Yale, Oei worked at the Broad Institute of MIT and Harvard. CBS Boston reported in 2017 that she was studying gene-editing techniques at the Broad Institute, where her team used gene-editing research to better understand genetic diseases and cancer.

=== Harvard doctoral work ===
Harvard Medical School's Chemical Biology PhD program listed Oei as a graduate student in the Kingston Lab, advised by Robert Kingston, beginning in 2017. Her doctoral work focused on canonical Polycomb Repressive Complex 1 condensation and epigenetic regulation. In 2020, the Karin Grunebaum Cancer Research Foundation listed Oei, then a third-year graduate student in chemical biology in the Kingston Lab, for a project titled "Understanding Polycomb Phase Separation in Neuroblastoma Epigenetics".

== New England Patriots cheerleading ==
Oei became a rookie member of the New England Patriots cheerleading squad in 2016. A Journal Inquirer profile reported that she had studied ballet and Irish step dance and saw the Patriots audition process as a way to continue dancing while working in science. The same profile described her as a world-ranked Irish step dance competitor and classically trained ballet dancer.

During the 2016 Patriots season, Oei balanced Broad Institute laboratory work with Patriots practices, games, and community appearances. CBS Boston profiled her in January 2017 in a segment on her work in gene editing and cheerleading, noting that she was then applying to graduate school. The Glastonbury Citizen reported that she cheered during the Patriots' 2016 season, including the team's run to Super Bowl LI in Houston, where New England defeated the Atlanta Falcons.

Oei also described the public-facing role as a way to encourage young students, especially girls, to see science as accessible and compatible with other pursuits.

== Selected publications ==
- Guo, Y. Eric; Oei, Theresa; Steitz, Joan A. (November 2015). "Herpesvirus saimiri MicroRNAs Preferentially Target Host Cell Cycle Regulators". Journal of Virology. 89 (21): 10901–10911. doi:10.1128/JVI.01884-15. PMC 4621106. PMID 26292323.
- Jaensch, Emily S.; Zhu, Jun; Cochrane, Joshua C.; Marr, Sharon K.; Oei, Theresa A.; Damle, Manashree; McCaslin, Ethan Z.; Kingston, Robert E. (2021). "A Polycomb domain found in committed cells impairs differentiation when introduced into PRC1 in pluripotent cells". Molecular Cell. 81: 4677-4691.e8. doi:10.1016/j.molcel.2021.09.018. PMC 8966356. PMID 34637753.
- Niekamp, Stefan; Marr, Sharon K.; Oei, Theresa A.; Subramanian, Radhika; Kingston, Robert E. (May 2, 2024). "Modularity of PRC1 composition and chromatin interaction define condensate properties". Molecular Cell. 84 (9): 1651-1666.e12. doi:10.1016/j.molcel.2024.03.001. PMC 11234260. PMID 38521066.
- Oei, Theresa Ann (2024). Investigating the Function of Canonical Polycomb Repressive Complex 1 Condensation (Ph.D. thesis). Harvard University Graduate School of Arts and Sciences.

== Awards and honors ==
- Finalist, 2006 Discovery Channel Young Scientist Challenge
- Connecticut Science Fair first place, physical sciences, senior division, 2008
- U.S. Presidential Scholar, 2011
- Namesake of 22784 Theresaoei
