= C. William Hanson =

C. William Hanson, III
- Other names: William Hanson; Bill Hanson
- Occupations: Internist, anesthesiologist, intensivist and medical futurist

Academic background
- Education: B.A., English; M.D.
- Alma mater: Yale University; University of Pennsylvania

Academic work
- Institutions: University of Pennsylvania; Stanford University; Princeton University

C. William Hanson, III is an American internist, anesthesiologist and intensivist as well as an academic, author and researcher. He is a Professor of Anesthesiology and Critical Care, Surgery and Internal Medicine at the Hospital of University of Pennsylvania and Professor of Computer and Information Science in the School of Engineering and Applied Science at the University of Pennsylvania. He was the inaugural the Chief Medical Information Officer of the University of Pennsylvania Health System between 2010 and 2024.

Hanson has experience in medical informatics and specializes clinically in cardiac anesthesia including heart and lung transplantation as well as intensive care medicine. His research regarding the use of electronic nose technology for the detection of diseases such as pneumonia and sinusitis by breath analysis has been featured in publications including Scientific American, Science and Wired Magazine. He holds 8 patents.

Hanson is a past president of the Society of Critical Care Anesthesiologists. He is a fellow of Society of Critical Care Medicine as well as of Philadelphia’s College of Medicine.

== Education ==
Hanson received his Bachelor’s degree in English from Yale University in 1977 and his medical degree from University of Pennsylvania in 1983. He completed his postgraduate training at Stanford University Hospital (internal medicine residency) and the University of Pennsylvania (anesthesiology residency) before completing his fellowship in Critical Care Medicine at the Hospital of the University of Pennsylvania in 1989.

== Career ==
Hanson was appointed by the University of Pennsylvania School of Medicine as an assistant professor of anesthesiology and critical care in 1990. In 1996, he was promoted to associate professor and to professor, in 2001. Hanson was previously a visiting professor at Princeton University from 2000 till 2005, where he taught medical informatics.

At the Hospital of the University of Pennsylvania, Hanson was appointed division chief of Critical Care Medicine in 1993 and medical director of the Surgical Intensive Care Unit in 1995 and held these designations till 2010. During this term, he also served as chairman of the medical board. At University of Pennsylvania Health System, Hanson served as the inaugural medical director of Penn E-Lert, a tele-intensive care system, for a six-year term before being appointed as chief medical information officer and vice president in 2010. He has also served as the acting chair of the Department of Anesthesiology and Critical Care. He is currently a visiting faculty member at Princeton University at Princeton Precision Health and will be teaching a course in the Department of Computer Science in the Spring of 2026.

== Research ==
Hanson was a pioneer in the development of electronic nose technology for medical diagnosis. He researched the use of this sensing technology in distinguishing cerebrospinal fluid from serum, for the diagnosis of bacterial sinusitis, conducting in-vitro discrimination of upper aero-digestive tract tumor cell lines and for the diagnosis of pneumonia and other infectious diseases. He has also written about various other medical applications of electronic noses and tongues.

In 2008, Hanson published his book, The Edge of Medicine: The Technology That Will Change Our Lives, which profiles the innovations in biotechnology that are revolutionizing the delivery of medical care and the ways in which these innovations are altering the human experience. The New York Times characterized the book as a "guide to the universe of miracles coming soon to a hospital near you." Kenneth R. Foster reviewed that the "book is impressively well written and aimed at a popular audience."

Hanson published Smart Medicine: How the Changing Role of Doctors Will Revolutionize Health Care in 2011 and addressed the revolutionary changes that are soon to sweep through the medical community. His book is reviewed as "an appealing, positive, and thoughtful look at the changing world of medicine", "highly recommended" and "a thought-provoking look at technology's role in modern health care."

== Bibliography ==
=== Books ===
- The Intensive Care Unit Manual (2000) ISBN 978-0721621975
- Healthcare Informatics (2005) ISBN 978-0071440660
- Procedures in Critical Care (2008) ISBN 978-0071641210
- The Edge of Medicine: The Technology That Will Change Our Lives (2008) ISBN 978-0230621091
- Smart Medicine: How the Changing Role of Doctors Will Revolutionize Health Care (2011) ISBN 978-0230120938
- The Intensive Care Unit Manual 2nd edition. (2013) ISBN 978-1416024552

=== Selected articles ===
- Hanson CW, Deutschman CS, Anderson HL, Reilly PM, Behringer EC, Schwab CW, Price J: Effects of an organized critical care service on outcomes and resource utilization: A prospective cohort study. Critical Care Medicine 27(2): 270-274, February 1999.
- Marshall BE, Hanson CW, Frasch F, Marshall C: Role of HPV in pulmonary gas exchange and blood flow distribution. Pathophysiology Intensive Care Medicine 20(5): 379-389, May 1994.
- Hanson CW, Marshall BE: Artificial intelligence applications in the intensive care Unit. Critical Care Medicine 29(2): 427-435, February 2001.
- Hanson CW. Thaler ER: Electronic nose prediction of a clinical pneumonia score: biosensors and microbes. Anesthesiology 102(1): 63-68, January 2005.
- Hanson CW, Marshall BE, Frasch HF, Marshall C: The causes of hypercarbia in patients with chronic obstructive pulmonary disease. Critical Care Medicine 24(1): 23-28, January 1996.
