= Joseph Augustus Blake =

American surgeon (1864–1937)

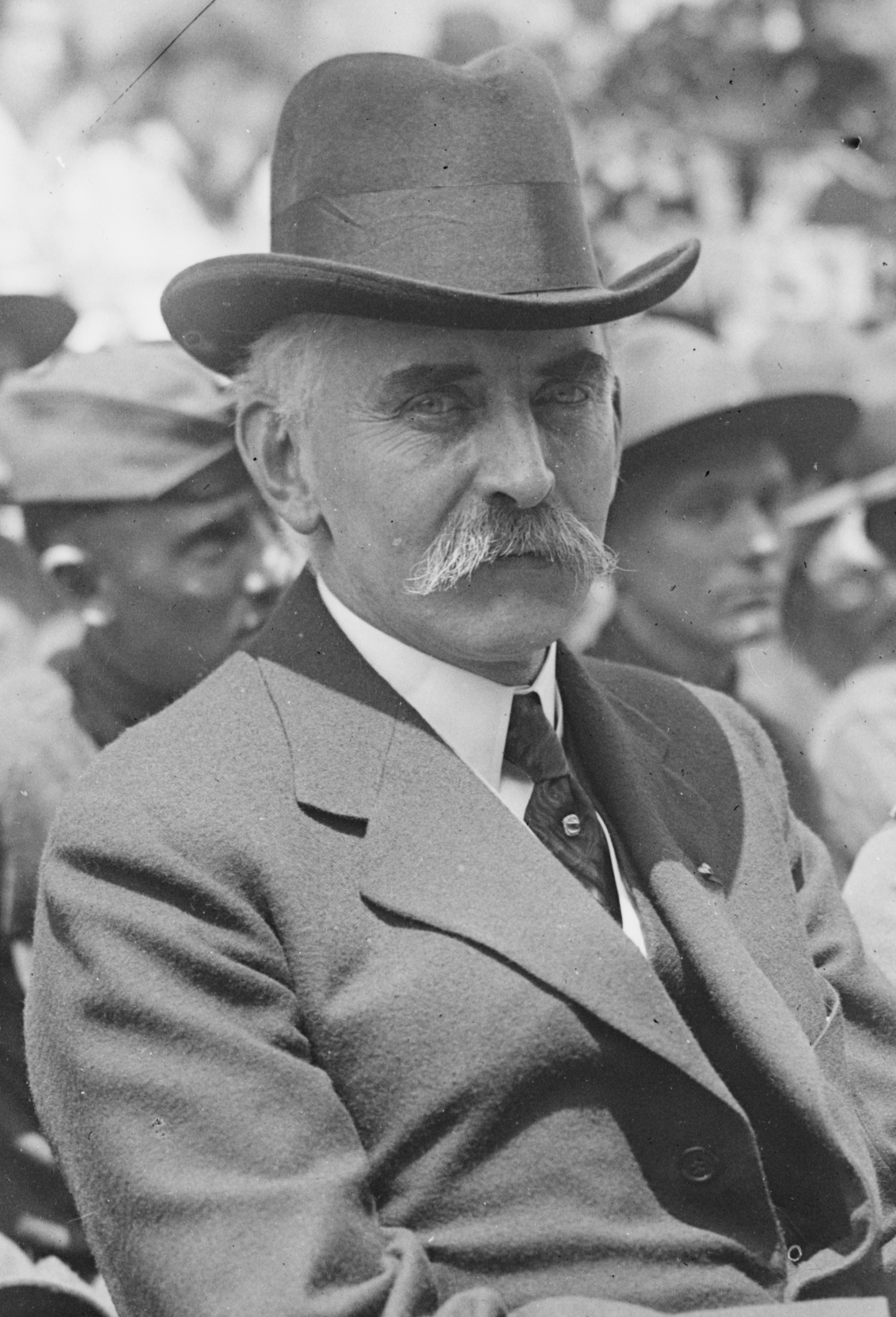
- Born: August 31, 1864; San Francisco, California, U.S.
- Died: August 12, 1937 (aged 72); Litchfield, Connecticut, U.S.
- Resting place: East Cemetery, Litchfield, Connecticut, U.S.
- Education: Yale College (AB, 1885; PhB, 1886); College of Physicians and Surgeons, Columbia University (MD, 1889)
- Occupations: Surgeon, medical educator, military physician
- Employer(s): Columbia University; Roosevelt Hospital; Presbyterian Hospital
- Known for: Chair of surgery at Columbia University; World War I military surgery in France; Gun-shot Fractures of the Extremities
- Spouse(s): Catharine Ketchum; Katherine Duer Mackay; Florence Mary Drake
- Children: 8
- Parent(s): William Phipps Blake; Charlotte Haven Lord Hayes Blake

Joseph Augustus Blake (August 31, 1864 - August 12, 1937) was an American surgeon, medical educator, and World War I military physician. He was professor and chair of surgery at the College of Physicians and Surgeons of Columbia University and was associated with major New York hospitals, including Roosevelt Hospital and Presbyterian Hospital. In 1913 he resigned from the Columbia chair of surgery, and at the outbreak of World War I he left prominent positions in New York to serve in France.

Blake successively headed volunteer war hospitals at Neuilly, Ris-Orangis, and Paris before entering the United States Army medical service in 1917. His surgical work in France was associated especially with the treatment of severe war wounds and fractures, and he published the wartime monograph Gun-shot Fractures of the Extremities in 1918.

== Early life and education ==
Blake was born in San Francisco on August 31, 1864. He was the son of William Phipps Blake, a geologist, mineralogist, mining engineer, and educator, and Charlotte Haven Lord Hayes Blake. His father had been connected with major geological and mining surveys and later held academic appointments in the western United States.

Blake attended Yale College, where he received an A.B. in 1885 and a Ph.B. in 1886. He then studied medicine at the College of Physicians and Surgeons in New York, now Columbia University Vagelos College of Physicians and Surgeons, and received his M.D. in 1889. Yale later awarded him an honorary Master of Arts degree.

== Surgical career ==
=== New York hospitals and Columbia University ===
After medical school, Blake built his career in New York surgery. Yale's obituary record listed his early hospital appointments and later service in New York hospitals, including Harlem Hospital and Roosevelt Hospital. By the early twentieth century he was identified in professional directories as a professor of surgery at the College of Physicians and Surgeons of Columbia University and as a surgeon connected with Roosevelt Hospital.

Columbia University archival records identify Blake as professor of surgery and chair of the Department of Surgery, with correspondence in Columbia's central files dating from 1892 to 1913. A 2025 history of surgeon Allen Oldfather Whipple also describes Blake as chairman of surgery at Columbia and notes that Whipple interned at Roosevelt Hospital under Blake in 1909 and 1910.

Blake resigned from Columbia's chair of surgery in 1913. His resignation came shortly before the reorganization of his career around war service in France.

=== Surgical research and publications ===
Blake published on abdominal surgery, wound treatment, intestinal surgery, and war injuries. In 1907, he and R. M. Brown published "Studies in Intestinal Exclusion" in the Annals of Surgery, based on work from Columbia's Laboratory for Surgical Research. He also contributed chapters or articles to wider surgical literature, and his name appears in medical catalogues and collections connected with general surgery and military surgery.

His best-known separate publication was Gun-shot Fractures of the Extremities, issued in Paris by Masson in 1918. A 1919 American edition appeared as Fractures: Being a Monograph on "Gun Shot Fractures of the Extremities". The work drew directly on Blake's wartime experience treating compound fractures and other serious limb injuries in France.

== World War I service ==
=== Volunteer hospitals in France ===
Blake's World War I work began before the United States entered the war. According to the New York Academy of Medicine, he was one of the most noted American physicians who volunteered in France between 1914 and 1917. At the beginning of the war he resigned from prominent posts at Presbyterian Hospital and Columbia's College of Physicians and Surgeons and went to France. He successively headed volunteer hospitals in Neuilly, Ris-Orangis, and Paris before entering the United States military medical service in August 1917.

Blake's service at Ris-Orangis became especially prominent. The hospital, also known as Hôpital Militaire V.R. 76 or the Johnstone-Reckitt hospital, was housed in a converted college outside Paris and treated wounded soldiers under French military authority with British and American support. Charles Terry Butler, a young Columbia-trained physician, postponed an internship at Presbyterian Hospital to serve under Blake there in 1916. Butler later recalled that the opportunity offered unusual training in the treatment of serious war wounds under an experienced surgeon.

A history of the hospital described Blake as a New York surgeon whose work made the Ris hospital known throughout France. The New York Academy of Medicine account likewise described Ris-Orangis as one of the successful wartime hospitals and identified Blake as the hospital's director in staff photographs from 1916.

=== Military rank and fracture surgery ===
During the war, Blake held the rank of lieutenant colonel in the Medical Corps of the United States Army. His work focused heavily on traumatic fractures, infected wounds, and the practical management of injuries caused by bullets, shell fragments, and battlefield contamination. His publications from the period included Gun-shot Fractures of the Extremities and a French-language work on suspension and extension in the treatment of limb fractures.

The Wellcome Collection describes Gun-shot Fractures of the Extremities as a 136-page illustrated work published in Paris in 1918, with subjects including bone fractures, extremity injuries, and gunshot wounds. Medical-history collections have treated the book as part of the World War I literature of military surgery and gunshot-wound treatment.

== Professional memberships and reputation ==
Blake was active in professional surgical and scientific circles. He was listed as a member of the Association of American Anatomists in the early twentieth century, where he was identified as professor of surgery at Columbia's College of Physicians and Surgeons. Genealogical and scientific membership indexes also list him as a fellow of the American Association for the Advancement of Science and as connected with surgical and medical societies, including the American Surgical Association, the New York Academy of Medicine, and the New York Surgical Society.

His reputation as a teacher extended through later surgeons trained in New York. Allen Oldfather Whipple, later known for the Whipple procedure, interned under Blake at Roosevelt Hospital and followed him to Presbyterian Hospital after institutional changes in the early 1910s. The New York Academy of Medicine account of Charles Terry Butler's wartime service states that Blake's reputation was strong enough to attract both workers and funds for his French hospital work.

== Personal life ==
Blake married Catharine Ketchum on December 17, 1890. They had two sons.

In 1914, Blake married Katherine Duer Mackay in Paris after her divorce from Clarence H. Mackay. Their marriage became part of widely reported New York society coverage because Mackay had been a prominent suffrage organizer and social figure. Blake and Mackay had children together and later divorced. Blake later married Florence Mary Drake.

Blake's children included Joseph Augustus Blake Jr., Francis Hayes Blake, Katherine Blake Libich, Joan Blake Harjes, William Alexander Duer Blake, Mary Duer Blake von Boecklin, Theodore Whitney Blake, and Edwin Thorne Blake.

== Death ==
Blake died in Litchfield, Connecticut, on August 12, 1937. The Annals of Surgery published a memorial notice for him later that year.

== Selected publications ==
- Blake, Joseph A.; Brown, R. M. (1907). "Studies in Intestinal Exclusion". Annals of Surgery.
- Blake, Joseph A. (1918). Gun-shot Fractures of the Extremities. Paris: Masson.
- Blake, Joseph A. (1919). Fractures: Being a Monograph on "Gun Shot Fractures of the Extremities". New York: D. Appleton and Company.
- Blake, Joseph A. (1919). "Early Experience in the War". The Military Surgeon. 45: 629–630.

== See also ==
- Columbia University Vagelos College of Physicians and Surgeons
- Roosevelt Hospital (New York City)
- Presbyterian Hospital (New York City)
- World War I casualties
- Military medicine
- American Ambulance Field Service
