= Karilyn Crockett =

- Born: June 1973 (age 53)
- Occupations: Community organizer; academic; educator

Karilyn Crockett (born June 1973) is an American historian, educator, and community organizer focusing on urban development, racial equity, and community memory. Based in Boston, Massachusetts, Crockett has played a significant role in shaping local urban policy and civic engagement through her academic work and her roles in city government. She is best known for her book People Before Highways: Boston Activists, Urban Planners and a New Movement for City Making, which explores the grassroots resistance to highway construction in Boston during the 1960s and for directing Hacking the Archive, a community engagement initiative to use archival and historical materials to design equity action. In 2024, she was named one of the 150th most influential Bostonians by Boston Magazine.

== Early life and education ==
Crockett was born in June 1973 and raised in the Dorchester neighborhood of Boston, Massachusetts. After completing her early education, Crockett earned a Bachelor of Arts in Cultural Anthropology from Yale University in 1995. She continued her education abroad, receiving a Master of Science in Geography from the London School of Economics. She later returned to Yale, earning a Master of Arts in Religion and Ethics from Yale Divinity School, and a Ph.D. in American Studies.

In 1995, Crockett co-founded MYTOWN, a Boston-based nonprofit that engaged high school students in public history. Through MYTOWN, students conducted historical research and led walking tours of their neighborhoods, highlighting the city’s often overlooked Black and immigrant histories. MYTOWN has been credited with providing jobs to over 300 Boston youth and was named "One of the ten best Youth Humanities Programs in America" by the National Endowment for the Humanities. Crockett has described MYTOWN as her “first job out of college” and a functional part of her professional journey.

== Career ==
Crockett is an assistant professor at the Massachusetts Institute of Technology (MIT) in the Department of Urban Studies and Planning. Her academic work explores the intersections of race, geography, and public policy, focusing on how historical memory can inform contemporary planning practices.

Prior to becoming a professor at MIT, Crockett held several senior roles in Boston’s city government, including Director of Economic Policy and Research and Director of Small Business Development. In 2020, Boston mayor Martin J. Walsh appointed Crockett as the inaugural Chief of Equity, a Cabinet-level position. As Boston’s first Chief of Equity, Crockett focused on integrating fairness and justice into city operations and planning processes. Her work centered on building long-term policy frameworks that addressed systemic inequality. She resigned the position after less than year, with some speculating that she would run for mayor to replace Walsh.

In 2018, Crockett published People Before Highways: Boston Activist, Urban Planners, and a New Movement for City Making with University of Massachusetts Press. The book tells the story of grassroots opposition to proposed highway expansions in 1960s Boston. Highlighting the efforts of neighborhood activists, Crockett details how ordinary citizens challenged top-down urban renewal plans and reshaped the city’s development priorities. The Boston Public Library named the book one of the “Ten Best Books About Boston of the 2010s.

== Honors and awards ==
Crockett has been awarded several distinctions and honors for her excellence in research and community organizing. Her awards include:

- Paul Gray Award for Public Service, MIT Priscilla King Gray Public Service Center, 2025
- Black Women Lead Honoree, Greater Grove Hall Main Streets Black Women Lead Initiative, 2023
- William Sloane Coffin '56 Award for Peace and Justice, Yale Divinity School, 2022
- Religion and Public Life Government Fellow, Harvard Divinity School, 2021-2022
- Walk Massachusetts Golden Shoe Award, Walk Massachusetts, 2003
