= List of histologic stains that aid in diagnosis of cutaneous conditions =

A number of histologic stains are used in the field of dermatology that aid in the diagnosis of conditions of or affecting the human integumentary system.

Positive histologic stains that aid in the diagnosis of conditions of or affecting the human integumentary system
Stain	Cell, material, and/or structure(s) stained	Condition(s) in which stain is positive
Actin-specific enolase		Infantile digital fibromatosis
AE1/AE3		Squamous cell carcinoma
Alcian blue		Lipoid proteinosis Papular mucinosis Scleredema; Pretibial myxedema Mucopolysaccharidoses
Alizarin red		Calcinosis cutis
Azure A	Mast cell	Mastocytosis
Bcl-2		Basal cell carcinoma Primary cutaneous marginal zone lymphoma Diffuse large B-cell lymphoma leg type
Bcl-6		Primary cutaneous follicular lymphoma
BerEp4		Desmoplastic trichoepithelioma Basal cell carcinoma
Brown–Brenn		Eumycotic mycetoma
CAM 5.2		Merkel cell carcinoma
CCR7		Melanoma
Carcinoembryonic antigen (CEA)	Eccrine gland	Extramammary Paget's disease Microcystic adnexal carcinoma Eccrine poroma
CD1a	Langerhans cell	Langerhans cell histiocytosis Indeterminate cell histiocytosis
CD4		Mycosis fungoides Sézary syndrome
CD5		Chronic lymphocytic leukemia
CD8		Pagetoid reticulosis
CD10		Renal cell carcinoma
CD15		Hodgkin's disease
CD20		Primary cutaneous marginal zone lymphoma Primary cutaneous follicular lymphoma Diffuse large B-cell lymphoma leg type
CD30 (Ki-1)		Lymphomatoid papulosis Primary cutaneous anaplastic large cell lymphoma Eosinophilic ulcer of the oral mucosa Hodgkin's disease
CD31	Endothelial cell	Kaposi's sarcoma Angiosarcoma; Intravascular large B-cell lymphoma
CD34	Dermal dendritic cell	Desmoplastic trichoepithelioma Spindle cell lipoma Angiosarcoma; Dermatofibrosarcoma protuberans Atypical fibroxanthoma Pleomorphic fibroma Intravascular large B-cell lymphoma
CD38	Plasma cell	Multiple myeloma Plasmablastic lymphoma Pagetoid reticulosis
CD44		Merkel cell carcinoma
CD56		Extranodal natural killer cell lymphoma Merkel cell carcinoma
CD68		Benign cephalic histiocytosis Generalized eruptive histiocytosis Indeterminate cell histiocytosis Juvenile xanthogranuloma Necrobiotic xanthogranuloma Giant cell reticulohistiocytoma Multicentric reticulohistiocytosis Xanthoma disseminatum Rosai–Dorfman disease Atypical fibroxanthoma Melanoma
CD79a		Primary cutaneous marginal zone lymphoma Primary cutaneous follicular lymphoma Diffuse large B-cell lymphoma leg type
CD117	Mast cell	Mastocytosis
CD138	Plasma cell	Multiple myeloma Plasmablastic lymphoma
CD207 (Langerin)	Langerhans cell	Langerhans cell histiocytosis
Chloracetate esterase (Leder)	Mast cell	Mastocytosis
Chromogranin A		Merkel cell carcinoma
Cystokeratin 7		Paget's disease (breast and extramammary)
Cytokeratin 20		Extramammary Paget's disease of endodermal origin Merkel cell carcinoma
Colloidal iron		Papular mucinosis Scleredema; Pretibial myxedema
Congo red		Amyloidosis; Colloid milium
Crystal violet		Amyloidosis; Colloid milium
D2-40		Lymphangioma circumscriptum
de Galantha		Pseudogout
Dylon		Amyloidosis
Epithelial membrane antigen (EMA)	Eccrine gland Sebaceous gland	Paget's disease extramammary Paget's disease Microcystic adnexal carcinoma Sebaceous carcinoma Renal cell carcinoma Schwannoma
Factor VIII		Dabska-type hemangioendothelioma Angiosarcoma
Factor XIII		Cutaneous focal mucinosis
Factor XIIIa	Dermal dendritic cell	Dermatofibroma; Epithelioid cell histiocytoma
Fite		Leprosy; Nocardiosis (Note: The Ziehl-Neelsen stain is positive in leprosy but notable for being negative with nocardiosis. Fite stain is positive in leprosy and nocardiosis.)
Fontana–Masson	Cryptococcus neoformans	Cryptococcus
Giemsa	Mast cell	Mastocytosis; Mucopolysaccharidoses
Gomori methenamine silver	Histoplasma capsulatum Blastomyces dermatitidis Coccidioides immitis Paracoccidioides brasiliensis	Histoplasmosis; Blastomycosis; Coccidioidomycosis; Paracoccidioidomycosis
Gross cystic disease fluid protein 15 (GCDFP-15)	Apocrine gland	Extramammary Paget's disease of cutaneous origin
HAM56	Histiocyte	Dermatofibroma
HMB45	Gp100 (pmel17, silver protein)	Melanoma (Note: Melanoma stains positive with HMB45 with the exception of desmoplastic melanoma.)
India	Cryptococcus neoformans	Cryptococcus
KP-1	Histiocyte	Dermatofibroma
LYVE-1		Kaposi's sarcoma
MAC387	Histiocyte	
MART-1 (MART-1)		Melanoma
Masson's trichrome		Infantile digital fibromatosis
Mel-5	TYRP1	Melanoma
Methylene blue	Mast cell	Mastocytosis; Ochronosis
MIB-1		Melanoma
Muscle-specific actin		Glomus tumor Dermatofibroma; Infantile myofibromatosis
Neurofilament		Neurofibroma
Neuro-specific enolase		Merkel cell carcinoma
Non-aqueous alcoholic eosin stain (NAES)		Pseudogout
Oil red O		Sebaceous carcinoma Angiokeratoma corporis diffusum Subcutaneous fat necrosis of the newborn
Peanut agglutinin		Basal cell carcinoma
Phosphotungsten acid-hematoxylin (PTAH)		Infantile digital fibromatosis
Pogoda red		Amyloidosis
Protein gene product 9.5 (PGP9.5)		Nerve sheath myxoma
Silver nitrate	Urate crystal	Gout
Sirius red		Amyloidosis
Smooth muscle actin (SMA)		Angiomyxoma; Leiomyosarcoma
SOX10	Neuroectodermal neoplasms of neural crest origin, especially: Melanoma, although desmoplastic melanomas may be only focally positive.; Nevus	
Sudan IV		Leprosy
Sudan black		Sebaceous carcinoma
Synaptophysin		Merkel cell carcinoma
S100	Melanocyte; Langerhans cell Schwann cell Chondrocyte; Adipocyte; Eccrine gland	Langerhans cell histiocytosis Indeterminate cell histiocytosis Schwannoma; Neurofibroma; Nerve sheath myxoma (Cellular neurothekeoma); Extraskeletal chondroma
Thioflavin T		Amyloidosis; Colloid milium
Toluidine blue	Mast cell	Mastocytosis; Mucopolysaccharidoses; Papular mucinosis Scleredema; Pretibial myxedema
Tryptase	Mast cell	Mastocytosis
Tyrosinase	Tyrosinase	Melanoma
Ulex eropaeus agglutinin		Dabska-type hemangioendothelioma
VEGF-3		Dabska-type hemangioendothelioma
VEGFR-3		Kaposi's sarcoma
Verhoeff van Gieson	Collagen; Elastin	Elastosis perforans serpiginosa Acquired perforating dermatosis Perforating periumbilical calcific elastosis Pseudoxanthoma elasticum
Vimentin	Non-specific mesenchymal components	Melanoma; Glomus tumor Dermatofibroma; Pleomorphic fibroma of the skin Epithelioid cell histiocytoma
von Kossa	Calcium	Calcinosis cutis Pseudoxanthoma elasticum
Wade		Leprosy
Wright	Blood cells	Transient neonatal pustular melanosis (Note: Staining of pustule contents in transient neonatal pustular melanosis will reveal numerous neutrophils); Erythema toxicum neonatorum (Note: Staining of pustule in erythema toxicum neonatorum will reveal numerous eosinophils); Granuloma inguinale
Ziehl–Neelsen stain		Leprosy

== See also ==
- List of conditions associated with café au lait macules
- List of contact allergens
- List of cutaneous conditions associated with increased risk of nonmelanoma skin cancer
- List of cutaneous conditions associated with internal malignancy
- List of cutaneous conditions caused by mutations in keratins
- List of cutaneous neoplasms associated with systemic syndromes
- List of cutaneous conditions caused by problems with junctional proteins
- List of dental abnormalities associated with cutaneous conditions
- List of genes mutated in cutaneous conditions
- List of genes mutated in pigmented cutaneous lesions
- List of human leukocyte antigen alleles associated with cutaneous conditions
- List of immunofluorescence findings for autoimmune bullous conditions
- List of inclusion bodies that aid in diagnosis of cutaneous conditions
- List of keratins expressed in the human integumentary system
- List of radiographic findings associated with cutaneous conditions
- List of specialized glands within the human integumentary system
- List of target antigens in pemphigoid
- List of target antigens in pemphigus
- List of verrucous carcinoma subtypes
