= Progressive nodular histiocytosis =

- Specialty: Dermatology

Progressive nodular histiocytosis is a cutaneous condition clinically characterized by the development of two types of skin lesions: superficial papules and deeper larger subcutaneous nodules. Progressive nodular histiocytosis was first reported in 1978 by Taunton et al. It is a subclass of non-Langerhans cell histiocytosis and a subgroup of xanthogranuloma.

== Signs and symptoms ==
Progressive nodular histiocytosis most frequently affects young to middle-aged adults who show up with widely distributed, randomly distributed, reddish-brown, cutaneous papules and nodules that are not painful or pruritic. Progressive nodular histiocytosis's clinical course is characterized by an unwavering lack of spontaneous remission. Over time, lesions grow larger and more numerous, and they can cause noticeable disfigurement. Although mucous involvement is possible, internal organs are typically unaffected. Mechanical interference caused by lesions in critical locations, such as the eyelids or the soles of the feet, can result in functional impairment. There is a rare possibility that the cutaneous lesions could cause systemic effects directly; microcytic anemia due to significant intralesional iron sequestration has been documented. Obstructive lesions in the upper airway have been associated with death, despite the fact that they are usually not life-threatening.

== Diagnosis ==
Histologically, it is typified by a diffuse infiltrate of Touton giant cells and xanthomatized histiocytes mixed in with spindle-shaped histiocytes with a whorl-like growth pattern.

== Treatment ==
The primary method of treating progressive nodular histiocytosis is surgical excision. However, a few cases have been reported to have improved following methotrexate administration. Other treatments such as carbon dioxide laser, intralesional as well as systemic steroids, and antineoplastic agents such as imatinib have mostly shown no effect on progressive nodular histiocytosis. Unfortunately, for those who are affected, recurrence is possible even after treatment.

== See also ==
- Non-X histiocytosis
