= Non-Langerhans cell histiocytosis =

- Other names: Rare histiocytoses
- Specialty: Hematology

Non-Langerhans cell histiocytosis, also known as rare histiocytoses, comprise all histiocyte, macrophage, and dendritic cell proliferative disorders that are not categorized as hemophagocytic lymphohistiocytosis (HLH) or Langerhans cell histiocytosis (LCH).

The spectrum of non-Langerhans cell histiocytoses include:

- Benign cephalic histiocytosis
- Generalized eruptive histiocytoma
- Indeterminate cell histiocytosis
- Juvenile xanthogranuloma
- Progressive nodular histiocytoma
- Necrobiotic xanthogranuloma
- (Giant cell) reticulohistiocytoma
- Multicentric reticulohistiocytosis
- Rosai–Dorfman disease
- Xanthoma disseminatum
- Kikuchi disease
- Erdheim–Chester disease.
