= Histiocytoma (dog) =

Benign tumor in dogs

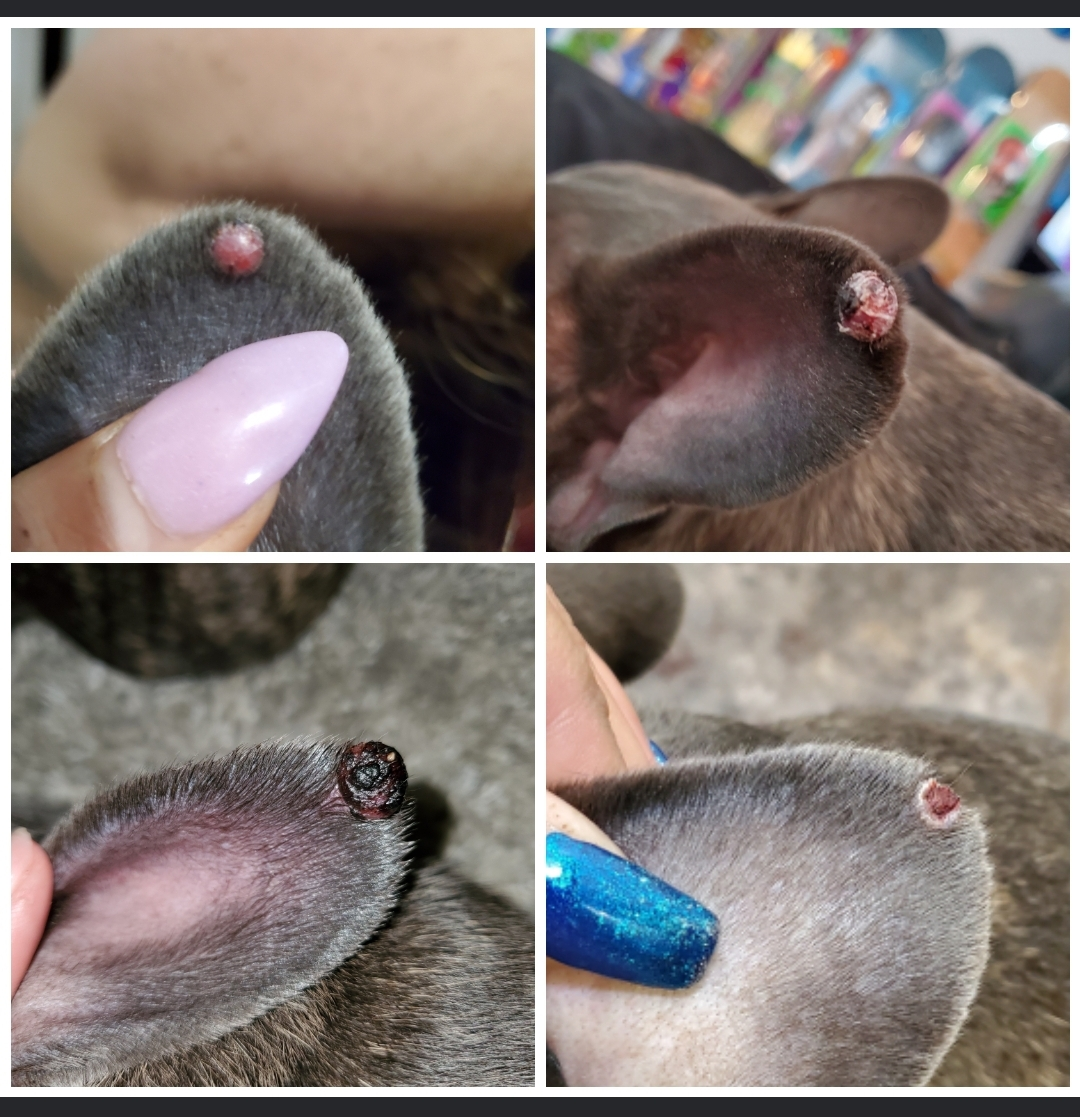
Progression of a Histocytoma on a French Bulldog Ear -2 months time

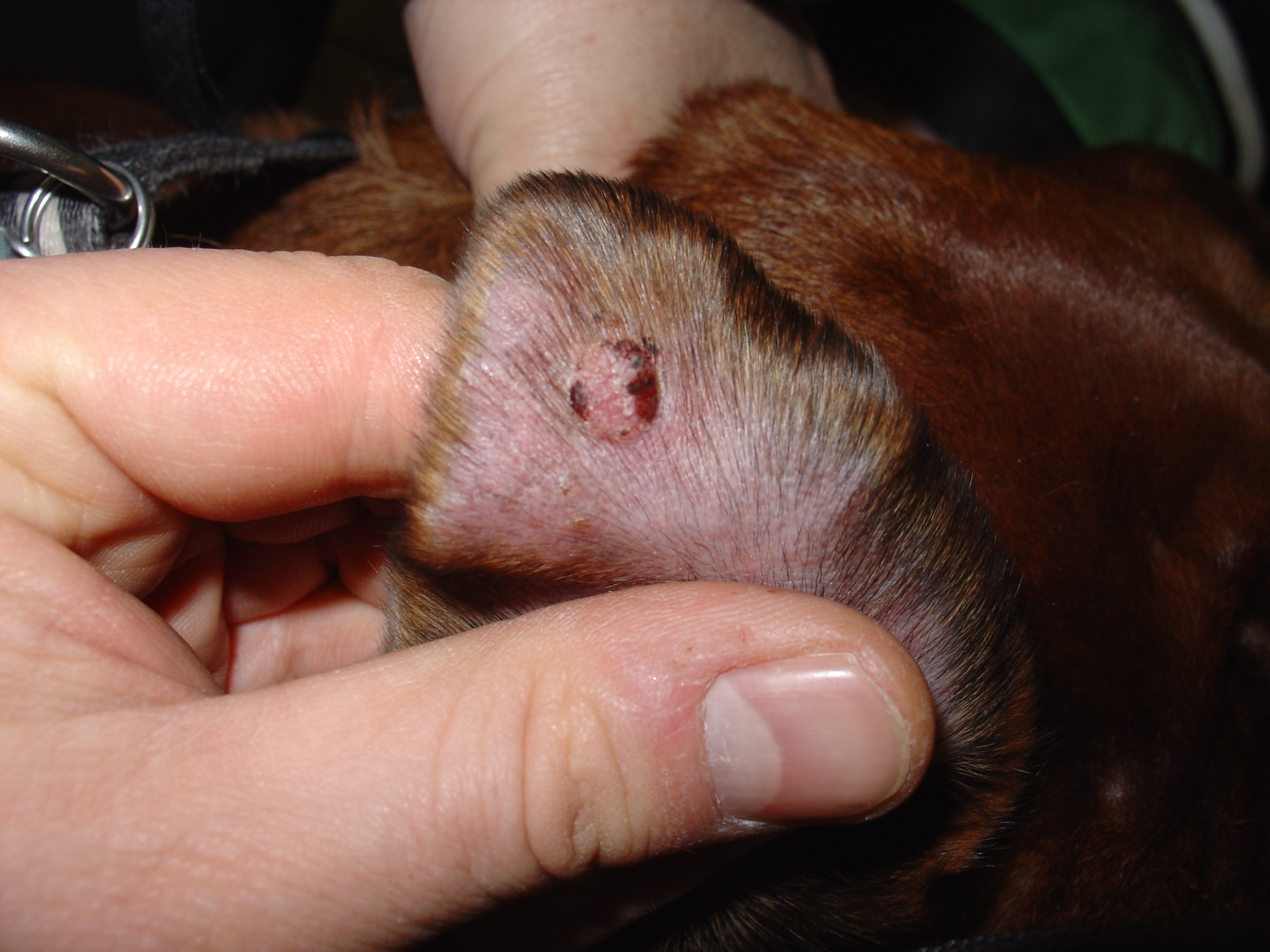
A histiocytoma on the ear of a dog

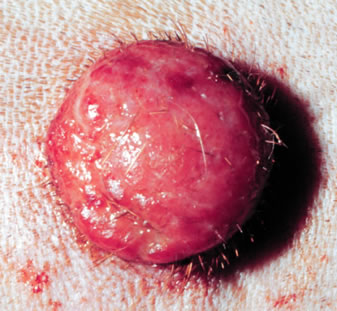
Canine Cutaneous Histiocytoma on a young boxer dog

A histiocytoma in the dog is a benign tumor. It is an abnormal growth in the skin of histiocytes (histiocytosis), a cell that is part of the immune system. A similar disease in humans, Hashimoto-Pritzker disease, is also a Langerhans cell histiocytosis. Dog breeds that may be more at risk for this tumor include Bulldogs, American Pit Bull Terriers, American Staffordshire Terriers, Scottish Terriers, Greyhounds, Boxers, and Boston Terriers. They also rarely occur in goats and cattle.

== Histiocytic disorders ==
A histiocyte is a differentiated tissue cell that has its origin in the bone marrow. The source for histiocytes is the monocyte/macrophage line. Monocytes (found in the blood) and macrophages (found in tissue) are responsible for phagocytosis (ingestion) of foreign material in the body. Langerhans cells are dendritic cells found in the skin and function by internalizing antigens (foreign particles) and presenting them to T cells. They arise from monocytes. Histiocytic disorders refer to diseases that are caused by abnormal behavior of these cells. They include the following:

- Reactive diseases of Langerhans cells
  - Histiocytomas
  - Cutaneous histiocytosis
  - Systemic histiocytosis
- Reactive diseases of macrophages
  - Hemophagocytic syndrome - a condition where macrophages phagocytose myeloid and erythroid precursors (similar to hemophagocytic lymphohistiocytosis in humans)
- Malignant diseases of Langerhans cells
  - Malignant histiocytosis - a condition found in Bernese Mountain Dogs
  - Diffuse histiocytic sarcoma
  - Localized histiocytic sarcoma
- Malignant diseases of macrophages
  - Histiocytic lymphoma

== Tumor biology ==
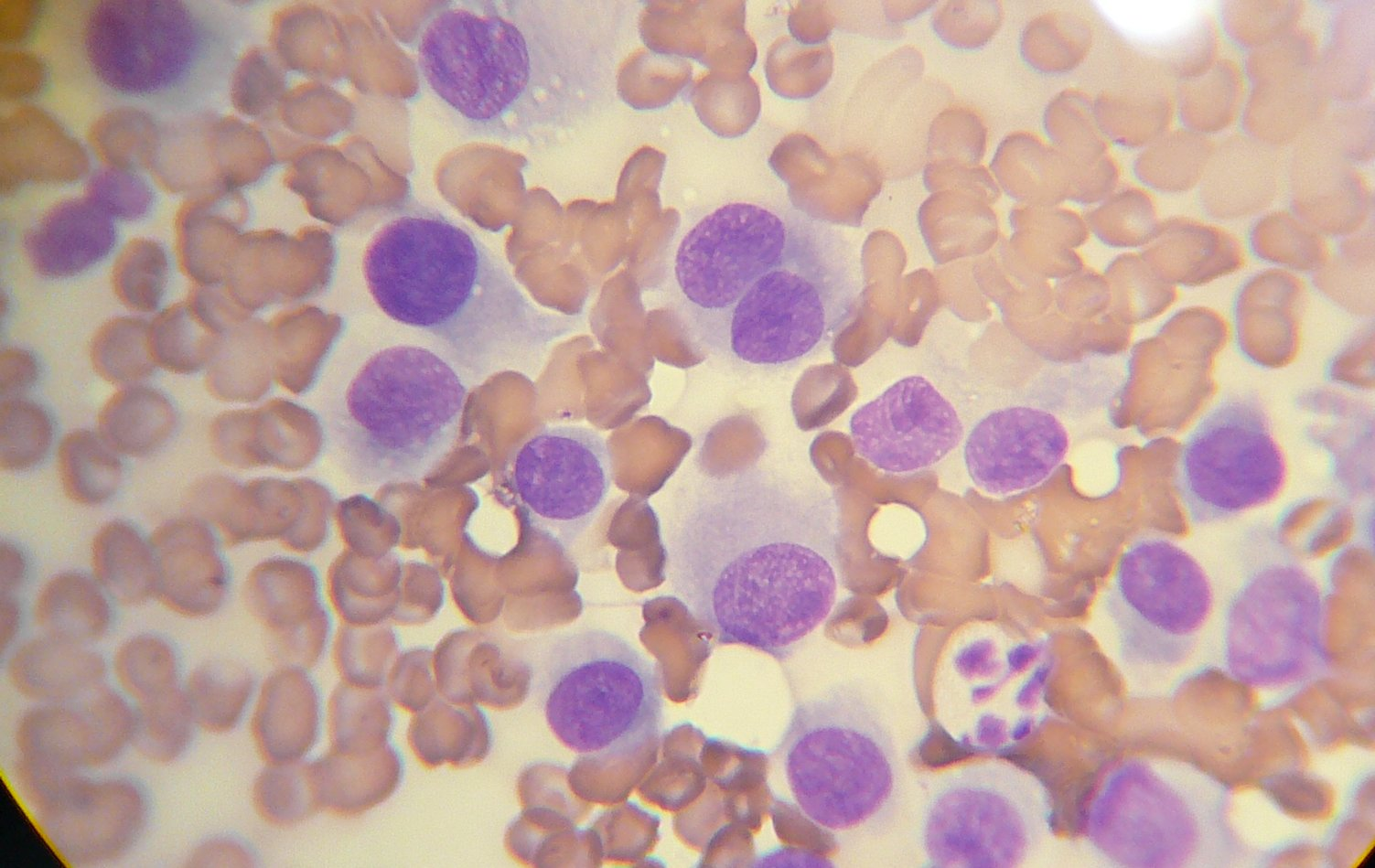
Canine histiocytoma cytology

A histiocytoma originates from epidermal Langerhans cells of antigen-presenting cell lineage. Spontaneous regression is common in these tumors, and it is mediated by infiltration of CD8-expressing T cells followed by expression of Type 1 T helper cell cytokines (such as Interferon-gamma) and recruitment of antitumour effector cells.

== Symptoms ==
Most commonly histiocytomas are found in young dogs and appear as a small, solitary, hairless lump, although Shar Peis may be predisposed to multiple histiocytomas. They are most commonly found on the head, neck, ears, and limbs, and are usually less than 2.5 cm in diameter. Ulceration of the mass is common. Diagnosis is made through cytology of the mass. Cytology reveals cells with clear to lightly basophilic cytoplasm and round or indented nuclei with fine chromatin and indistinct nucleoli.

== Treatment ==
Most histiocytomas will regress within two or three months. Histiocytomas can regress and disappear completely using antihistamine medications: H1 antagonist is diphenhydramine (Benadryl), and/or the H2 antagonist famotidine (Pepsid). Histiocyte growth can be suppressed using either or both of the H1/H2 antagonists. This can be curative. Surgical removal may be necessary if the tumor does not regress or if it is growing rapidly to a large size. Histiocytomas should never be treated with an intralesional injection of a corticosteroid, as remission relies on recognition of the tumour by the body's immune system which is suppressed by steroids.
