= Infantile fibromatosis =

Infantile fibromatosis may refer to:

- Aggressive infantile fibromatosis
- Infantile digital fibromatosis
