= HMB =

HMB may refer to:

== Compounds ==
- β-Hydroxy β-methylbutyric acid, (CH_{3})_{2}C(OH)CH_{2}COOH, a metabolite of the essential amino acid leucine, synthesized in the human body
- Human Melanoma Black, a monoclonal antibody

== Languages ==
- Humburi Senni language, spoken in Burkina Faso and Mali

== Places ==
- Half Moon Bay, California, city in the United States

== Sports ==
- Historical medieval battles, a modern sport

== Other ==
- Hawkeye Marching Band, the marching band for the University of Iowa
- Hukbong Mapagpalaya ng Bayan, the new name used by the Hukbalahap in their later rebellion against the Third Philippine Republic
- HabibMetro, a Swiss multinational bank in Pakistan
- Heavy menstrual bleeding, a menstrual condition
- Host Memory Buffer, an optional feature in version 1.2 of the NVMe specification, which allows SSDs to utilize the DRAM of the host machine
- His/Her Magesty's Barque
