= Reticulohistiocytoma =

- Specialty: Dermatology

Reticulohistiocytoma is a cutaneous condition characterized by a solitary, firm, dermal skin lesion of less than 1 cm in diameter. It usually occurs in young adults or middle aged people, most commonly in females. Affected regions include the head and neck region and the upper part of the trunk. It may coexist with certain neoplasms or vasculitis, and in 30 percent of patients with xanthelasma.

== See also ==
- Reticulohistiocytosis
- Non-X histiocytosis
