= Childhood granulomatous periorificial dermatitis =

- Other names: Gianotti-type perioral dermatitis or Facial Afro-Caribbean childhood eruption
- Specialty: Dermatology

Childhood granulomatous periorificial dermatitis (CGPD) is a rare benign granulomatous skin disease of unknown cause. The disorder was first described in 1970 by Gianotti in a case series of five children. CGPD is more common in boys than girls.

== Signs and symptoms ==
CGPD is characterized by the presence of small, raised, dome-shaped, flesh-colored or yellow-brown papules primarily distributed around the mouth, eyes, and nose. Affected children may also have papules on the ears, eyelids, cheeks, forehead, and nose. CGPD skin lesions rarely affect areas of the skin other than the face.

== Cause ==
The cause of CGPD is unknown.

== Diagnosis ==
The approach to diagnosing CGPD is controversial. Certain dermatologists suggest that ruling out infectious and allergic causes of similar skin eruptions and a skin biopsy demonstrating features consistent with CGPD is adequate for diagnosis. In contrast, other dermatologists advocate for performing a complete history and physical examination and obtaining laboratories and appropriate imaging to rule out cutaneous sarcoidosis. On microscopy, non-tuberculous granulomas with surrounding lymphocytes clustered around hair follicles may be seen; additionally, infiltrates of epithelioid macrophages, lymphocytes, and giant cells may also be seen.

Several conditions exhibit skin findings similar to those of CGPD. These conditions include perioral dermatitis, acne vulgaris, granulomatous rosacea, contact dermatitis, folliculitis, atopic dermatitis, cheilitis, medication-induced acneiform eruptions, lupus miliaris disseminatus faciei, benign cephalic histiocytosis, granulosis rubra nasi, xanthomas, zinc deficiency, glucagonoma, cutaneous sarcoidosis, and scabies.

== Treatment ==
Treatment recommendations for CGPD vary and may include observation without treatment, stopping the use of topical corticosteroids, and the use of topical or oral antibiotics as well as isotretinoin. Topical antibiotics such as metronidazole and erythromycin have been used for CGPD. Oral antibiotics of the tetracycline class such as minocycline, doxycycline, and tetracycline have been recommended for CGPD. Trimethoprim/sulfamethoxazole has also been used. The use of oral systemic antibiotics is limited by side effects such as nausea, vomiting, and sensitivity of the skin to sunlight. Tetracycline antibiotics are not recommended for children under the age of 8 since tetracyclines are known to deposit in teeth (thereby staining them) and impair bone growth in children.

The use of calcineurin inhibitor creams such as tacrolimus or pimecrolimus on the skin is controversial and results have been mixed. Certain studies found the use of topical calcineurin inhibitors led to resolution of CGPD whereas others saw incomplete resolution or prolonged symptoms. Topical azelaic acid has been used successfully to treat CGPD. Immediate discontinuation of topical corticosteroids is recommended since corticosteroids are thought to worsen CGPD.

== Prognosis ==
CGPD is known to be a temporary skin disease with a benign course. The skin papules typically resolve after a few months to a few years. After CGPD resolves, the skin may return to normal without scarring or may have small atrophic depressions with collagen loss, milia, or small pit-like scars.

== Epidemiology ==
CGPD occurs most often in children of Afro-Caribbean descent before puberty though reports of this disease occurring in Asian and Caucasian children have also been described. Due to the limited number of reported cases, it remains controversial whether CGPD occurs more often in African children than in children of other races. CGPD is more common in boys than girls.

== History ==
Gianotti et al. first described CGPD in five Italian children in 1970. In 1990, Williams et al. described a similar skin eruption in five children of Afro-Caribbean descent and coined the proposed term "facial Afro-Caribbean childhood eruption (FACE)". Subsequently, another article by Katz and Lesher first introduced the term CGPD since some reported cases were not found in children of Afro-Caribbean descent and to avoid confusion with perioral dermatitis.

== See also ==
- Perioral dermatitis
