= Epithelioid =

Epithelioid may refer to:

- Epithelioid cell, a cell that resembles epithelial cells
- Epithelioid sarcoma, a soft tissue tumour
- Epithelioid hemangioendothelioma, a vascular tumour occurring in the lining of blood vessels
- Epithelioid blue nevus, a melanocytic nevus
- Epithelioid sarcoma-like hemangioendothelioma, a group of vascular neoplasms
- Epithelioid and spindle-cell nevus, a benign melanocytic lesion affecting the epidermis and dermis
- Epithelioid hemangioma
- Epithelioid cell histiocytoma, a skin condition similar to dermatofibroma
