= Atypical fibroxanthoma =

- Other names: Atypical fibrous histiocytoma
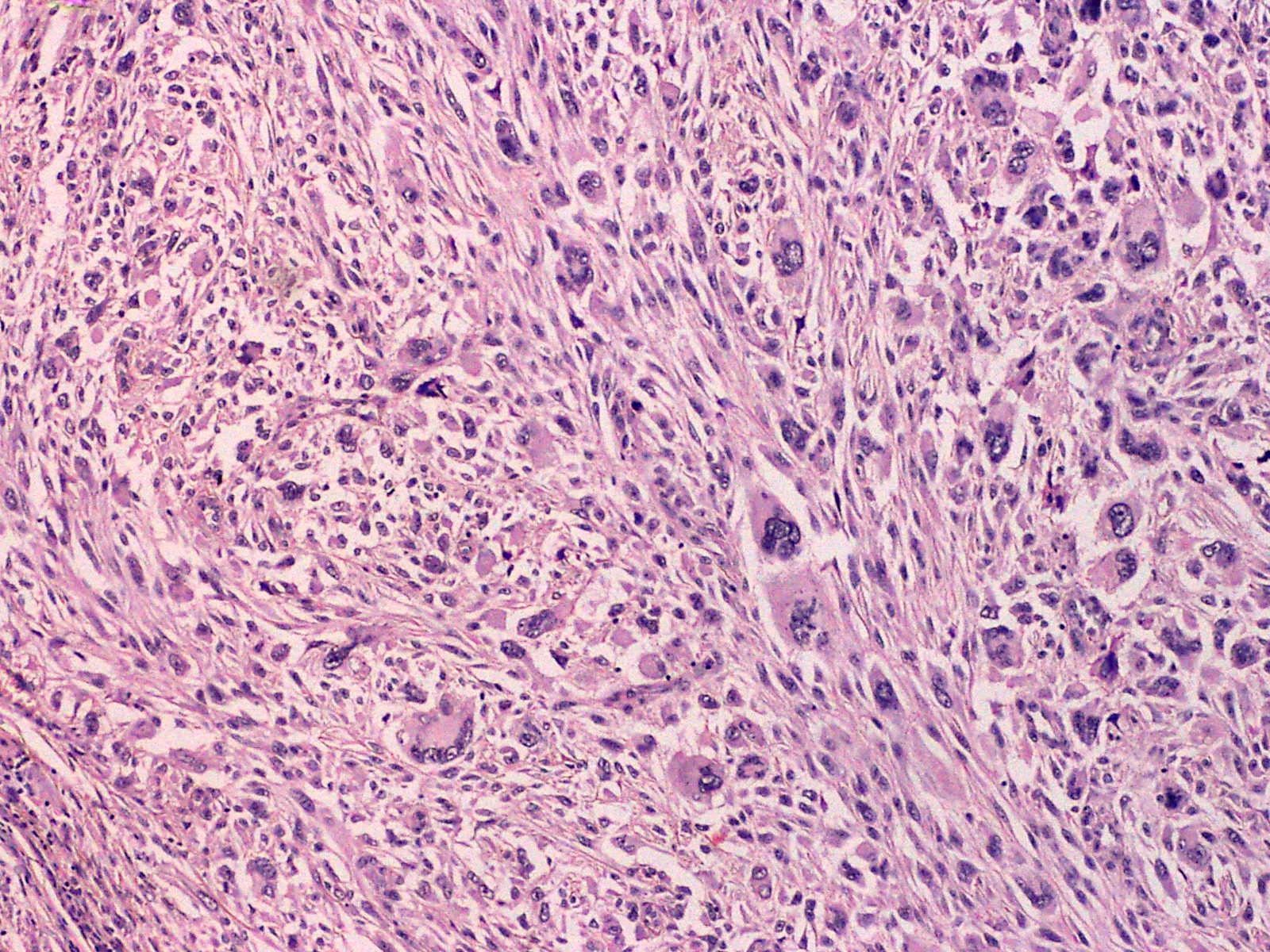
- Atypical fibroxanthoma
- Specialty: Oncology, rheumatology
- Symptoms: Ulceration or bleeding.
- Usual onset: Seventh or eighth decade of life.
- Risk factors: Sun exposure, old age, and xeroderma pigmentosum.
- Diagnostic method: Skin biopsy and immunohistochemical studies.
- Differential diagnosis: Undifferentiated pleomorphic sarcoma, basal cell carcinoma, squamous cell carcinoma, Merkel cell carcinoma, amelanotic melanoma, pyogenic granuloma, and adnexal tumors.
- Treatment: Surgical excision.

Atypical fibroxanthoma (AFX) of the skin is a low-grade malignancy related to malignant fibrous histiocytoma, which it resembles histologically. Atypical fibroxanthoma manifests as a hard, pink or red papule or nodule that grows over the course of several months and may bleed or ulcerate. They typically occur on the head and neck. Atypical fibroxanthoma is usually asymptomatic.

The exact cause of atypical fibroxanthoma is unknown. They may originate from myofibroblasts. Ultraviolet light and sun exposure are most likely risk factors. Atypical fibroxanthoma has also been associated with P53 mutations, xeroderma pigmentosum, radiation therapy, trauma, and immunosuppression.

Because atypical fibroxanthoma is an uncommon condition that can mimic other disorders, skin biopsy is used to make the diagnosis. Treatment involves surgical excision. Atypical fibroxanthoma is more common in men than women and usually appears in the seventh or eighth decade of life.

== Signs and symptoms ==
Atypical fibroxanthoma (AFX) often manifests as a single, hard, pink or red papule or nodule that swells over several months and has the potential to bleed or ulcerate. Tumors typically have a diameter of less than 2 cm, while they can occasionally be as large as several centimeters. There have been reports of an uncommon pigmented type of AFX.

The most frequent locations for AFX are the head and neck. Less frequently occurring tumors of the trunk and extremities may appear as bigger tumors. Sites like the cornea or eyelid are rarely impacted.

The majority of AFX tumors do not cause any symptoms. Rarely the lesion may be tender. It is rare to experience pruritus.

== Causes ==
It is unclear what causes atypical fibroxanthomas. It is thought to originate from myofibroblasts or cells that resemble fibroblasts. Since the majority of lesions form on White patients' sun-exposed heads and necks, ultraviolet light appears to be important.

In AFX, P53 mutations as well as cyclobutane pyrimidine dimers, UV photoproducts implicated in the development of skin cancer, have been found. AFX has been observed in children with xeroderma pigmentosum. There have been other hypothesized causes of AFX, such as radiation therapy, immunosuppression, burns, and trauma.

== Diagnosis ==
Since atypical fibroxanthoma is an uncommon disorder that mimics amelanotic melanomas, Merkel cell carcinomas, and basal and squamous cell carcinomas clinically, a skin biopsy is the gold standard for diagnosis.

Atypical fibroxanthoma (AFX) is frequently found to have a well-circumscribed, nonencapsulated dermal tumor that is either contiguous with the epidermis or separated from it by a narrow zone of collagen (Grenz zone); plump spindle cells with prominent nuclei, epithelioid cells, and multinucleated giant cells; atypical mitoses and severe cellular pleomorphism; and varying presence of thin or ulcerated epidermis or peripheral epidermal collarette.

== Treatment ==
For atypical fibroxanthoma, surgical excision is the preferred course of treatment. This was done with 1 cm margins in the past, but Mohs micrographic surgery and routine follow-up have become the norm, with recurrence rates ranging from 0.0% to 6.9%.

== Epidemiology ==
Men are more likely to experience AFX than women, and it often affects adults in their seventh or eighth decade of life. While AFX can affect people of any ethnicity, non-Hispanic White people have been the majority of those with reported instances. Patients with AFX frequently have a personal history of previous basal cell or squamous cell cancer.

== See also ==
- Skin lesion
- Skin cancer
