= Giant-cell reticulohistiocytoma =

- Other names: Solitary reticulohistiocytoma and solitary reticulohistiocytosis
- Specialty: Dermatology

Giant-cell reticulohistiocytoma, also known as solitary reticulohistiocytoma and solitary reticulohistiocytosis, is a cutaneous condition characterized by a solitary skin lesion.

== See also ==
- Indeterminate cell histiocytosis
- List of cutaneous conditions
