= Transient bullous dermolysis of the newborn =

- Specialty: Dermatology

Transient bullous dermolysis of the newborn (TBDN) is a skin condition that presents in newborns. It is characterized by blister formation secondary to even mild trauma.

A subtype of dystrophic epidermolysis bullosa, it is rare, usually inherited condition that presents with characteristic blisters at birth which resolve between six months and one year of age.

Blisters may cover the entire body including the mouth, and as they heal, they may leave some mild scarring. In addition, nail changes may occur which can persist to adulthood.

It is associated with COL7A1.

The condition was described by Ken Hashimoto in 1985.

== See also ==
- Skin lesion
