= Karl Touton =

German dermatologist and botanist

Karl Touton (2 May 1858, Alzey – 27 September 1934, Wiesbaden) was a German dermatologist and amateur botanist.

He studied medicine at the Universities of Würzburg and Freiburg, earning his medical doctorate in 1881. Following graduation, he furthered his education at Tübingen with pathologist Ernst Ziegler and in Vienna with dermatologists Moriz Kaposi and Isidor Neumann. From 1885 onward, he was a practicing dermatologist in Wiesbaden.

As a botanist, he specialized in studies of the genus Hieracium. He worked closely with botanist August Schlickum (1867–1946), with whom he conducted scientific excursions in the Rhineland and the Allgäu. His herbarium of around 20,000 items was acquired in 1929 and 1935 by the botanical museum at Berlin-Dahlem.

== Associated term ==
- "Touton giant cell": A multinucleated giant cell consisting of fused macrophages with a ring of nuclei surrounded by vacuolated, lipid-rich ("foamy") cytoplasm.

== Selected works ==
- Vergleichende Untersuchungen über die Entwickelung der Blasen in der Epidermis, 1882 – Comparative studies on the development of blisters in the epidermis.
- Über die sexuelle Verantwortlichkeit: ethische und medizinisch-hygienische Tatsachen und Ratschläge; ein Vortrag vor Abiturienten, 1919 – On sexual responsibility: ethical and medical-hygienic facts and advice, a lecture to high school seniors.
- Hauterkrankungen durch phanerogamische Pflanzen und ihre Produkte, 1932 – Skin diseases caused by phanerogamic plants, etc.
