= Amelanotic melanoma =

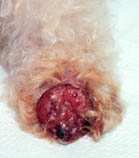
- Amelanotic melanoma on a dog's toe
- Specialty: Oncology, dermatology

Amelanotic melanoma is a type of skin cancer in which the cells do not make any melanin. They can be pink, red, purple or of normal skin color, and are therefore difficult to diagnose correctly. They can occur anywhere on the body, just as a typical melanoma can.

Often, amelanotic melanomas are mistaken for benign lesions, including dermatitis, benign neoplastic processes, or a different malignancy such as basal-cell carcinoma or squamous-cell carcinoma. A poor prognosis is associated with amelanotic lesions, partially due to the difficulty in achieving a diagnosis; however, metastatic amelanotic melanoma has a worse prognosis than other subtypes.

Survival after diagnosis of amelanotic melanoma was found in a 2014 seven-year study of 3,000 patients to be poorer than for pigmented melanoma, which was attributed to the more advanced stage at diagnosis due probably to difficulty of diagnosis. The study also suggested that amelanotic melanomas might grow faster than pigmented melanomas.

== Signs and symptoms ==
Three primary clinical forms of amelanotic melanoma have been proposed: skin-colored dermal plaque with no epidermal alterations, papulonodular form, and erythematous macule along with epidermal changes on skin exposed to the sun.

58% of cases of amelanotic melanoma are of the papulonodular form, which can mimic pyogenic granuloma or hemangioma and present as an ulcerated nodule or vascular lesion. 'ABCD' criteria (Asymmetry, Border irregularity, Color variegation, Diameter>6 mm) are rarely seen in non-papulonodular forms of amelanotic melanomas, which can present as erythematous macules or patches, scaly eczema-like, or skin-colored dermal plaques.

Though not around truly amelanotic melanomas, a faint flush or periphery of the pigment is frequently seen surrounding amelanotic lesions. The appearance of amelanotic melanomas can vary; they can be skin-colored, pink, red, or erythematous, with red amelanotic melanomas making up almost 70% of all amelanotic melanomas without melanin.

== Causes ==
=== Risk factors ===
Patients with amelanotic melanoma are typically diagnosed later in life—after age 50, in comparison to those with pigmented melanoma. However, amelanotic melanoma accounts for about 70% of childhood cases.

The relationship between amelanotic melanoma and sex is debatable; varying research indicates that the condition is more common in men, women, or neither sex. The potential preference for women may stem from the fact that they self-report suspicious skin conditions more frequently than men, while the potential predominance of men may be related to the fact that men expose themselves to more chronic outdoor sun exposure than women.

The majority of patients with amelanotic melanomas are white, and those with oculocutaneous albinism or type I skin and red hair are more likely to have them.

According to a population-based study, the likelihood of developing amelanotic melanoma is also increased by freckles, a sun-sensitive phenotype, the absence of nevi on the back, and a history of the disease in the past.

== Mechanism ==
Amelanotic melanoma's underlying mechanism is still unknown. Previous research categorized amelanotic melanoma as either poorly differentiated or dedifferentiated. Tyrosinase and microphthalmia-associated transcription factor (MITF) expression, however, allow amelanotic melanoma cells to retain their melanocytic lineage and melanin-forming capacity, just like their pigmented counterparts. Furthermore, a study discovered a small number of poorly differentiated tumor cells in samples of amelanotic melanoma. Hence, rather than being dedifferentiated or inadequately differentiated, amelanotic melanoma is far more likely to be classified as a subtype of melanoma that maintains the capacity to form melanin.

Amelanotic or hypomelanotic melanoma's may be caused by insufficient activity or quantity of tyrosinase, as evidenced by the decreased expressions of certain melanin-forming enzymes (such as tyrosinase) in amelanotic melanoma samples. Furthermore, it has been suggested that downregulation of tyrosinase and other melanocyte-specific genes, mediated by the absence of MITF expression, may be the cause of the amelanotic melanoma phenotype, particularly in those with chromosomal copy number gains in 8q24.

Amelanotic melanoma may also be caused by germline mutations in the MC1R, MITF, and P14arf genes in addition to increased copy number gains in 8q24. Research findings vary regarding the contribution of somatic gene mutations to the development of amelanotic melanoma. There have been reports of a higher incidence of KIT aberrations in entirely amelanotic acral melanoma compared to pigmented acral melanomas, as well as an elevated incidence of BRAF and KIT mutations in amelanotic melanomas. Other research, however, discovered a strong correlation between BRAF mutations and KIT alterations and melanoma hyperpigmentation.

== Diagnosis ==
The most reliable method for identifying amelanotic melanoma is histology combined with immunohistochemistry. Upon histopathologic examination, the presence of cords or nests of atypical melanocytes in the dermis typically results in the diagnosis of melanoma. Nevertheless, amelanotic melanoma can present with a variety of histopathologic or cytological characteristics, so the accurate diagnosis depends on immunohistochemical staining.

Markers like S100, MelanA, HMB-45, tyrosinase, MITF, and Ki-67 are often used. The most sensitive marker is S100 protein staining; other markers are relatively specific and include HMB-45, Melan-A, MITF, and tyrosinase. Specifically, HMB-45 staining intensity is highly specific and correlates well with melanin content; some amelanotic melanomas, especially true amelanotic melanomas, can even be negative for HMB-45. When separating benign melanocytic lesions from malignancies, Ki-67 is a useful tool.

The Fontana–Masson stain for melanin deposits may reveal pigment within lesions that are not visible on routine hematoxylin-eosin-stained sections. Additionally, melanosomes in hard-to-diagnose lesions can be found using electron microscopy.

== Treatment ==
Surgical excision with a large safety margin is the main treatment for localized amelanotic melanoma. The suggested margin size for amelanotic melanoma is debatable since it varies according to the lesion's development, thickness, and invasion depth. Guidelines from the Annals of Surgery, however, suggest that melanomas larger than 2 mm be removed with 2 cm margins.

It is advised to have a sentinel lymph node biopsy for lesions that are thicker or have high-risk characteristics. According to one study, patients who underwent an immediate lymph node dissection at presentation had a higher five-year survival rate than patients who underwent a delayed lymph node dissection. This provided better chances of survival for people with node metastases.

Adjuvant therapy may also be taken into consideration in advanced cases when patients exhibit high-risk characteristics like ulceration, a high rate of mitosis, or involvement of lymph nodes. Targeted therapies and systemic therapy using immune checkpoint inhibitors might be necessary. Both ipilimumab and nivolumab have demonstrated encouraging outcomes when used to treat amelanotic melanoma. But according to other research, postoperative radiation therapy only improved locoregional spread; no evidence has yet indicated that it improved overall survival.

== Outlook ==
A poor prognosis is typically observed in patients with amelanotic melanomas. While some research indicates that there is no statistically significant difference in survival between patients with pigmented melanoma and those with amelanotic melanoma, other studies involving larger case series indicate that patients with amelanotic melanomas frequently exhibit significantly higher risks of death and recurrence, as well as lower survival rates in terms of melanoma-specific survival, melanoma-free survival, 5-year survival, and overall survival.

== Epidemiology ==
Amelanotic melanomas are thought to account for 8% of all melanomas, making them extremely uncommon.

== See also ==
- Melanoma
- List of cutaneous conditions
