= Lupus miliaris disseminatus faciei =

- Other names: LMDF
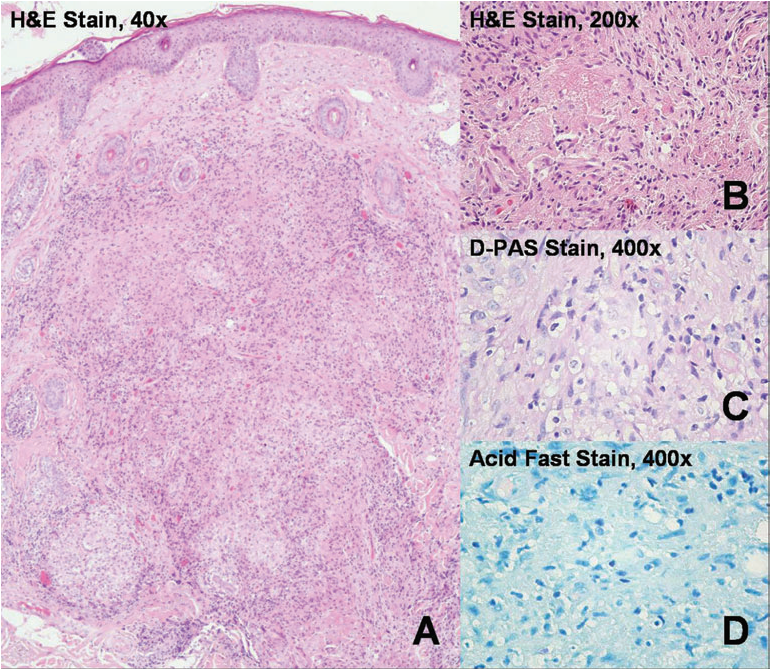
- Pathological findings of lupus miliaris disseminatus faciei
- Specialty: Dermatology

Lupus miliaris disseminatus faciei (LMDF), also known as acne agminata, is a disease with a similar appearance to acne vulgaris. The cause of LMDF is unknown.

LMDF usually occurs on the face, but extrafacial presentations have been reported. Mycobacterium tuberculosis or its products may cause a caseous necrosis and thus maybe one of several possible causes. Some authors view LMDF as a variant of granulomatous rosacea or a presentation related to Demodex folliculitis. Others suggest it as a new independent entity and proposed a new term: Facial Idiopathic GranUlomas with Regressive Evolution. Misago et al. postulated LMDF as a common adult form, childhood granulomatous periorificial dermatitis as a rare childhood form, and perioral dermatitis as a peculiar form exacerbated by topical corticosteroids. There are no randomized controlled trials available for the treatment of LMDF.

The usual first-line therapy is oral tetracyclines with variable success rates. Dapsone, low-dose prednisolone, clofazimine, and isotretinoin have all been tried in some cases. The 1450-nm diode laser has been shown to improve LMDF.

== See also ==
- List of cutaneous conditions
