= Reticulohistiocytosis =

- Specialty: Dermatology

Reticulohistiocytosis is a cutaneous condition of which there are two distinct forms:

- Reticulohistiocytoma
- Multicentric reticulohistiocytosis

== See also ==
- Non-X histiocytosis
