= Progressive nodular histiocytoma =

- Specialty: Dermatology

Progressive nodular histiocytoma is a cutaneous condition characterized by generalized, discrete yellow papules and nodules with prominent facial involvement.

== See also ==
- Generalized eruptive histiocytoma
- List of cutaneous conditions
