= Papular xanthoma =

- Specialty: Dermatology

Papular xanthoma is a cutaneous condition that is a rare form of non-X histiocytosis.

== See also ==
- Non-X histiocytosis
- List of cutaneous conditions
