= X-type histiocytosis =

- Specialty: Dermatology

X-type histiocytoses are a clinically well-defined group of cutaneous syndromes characterized by infiltrates of Langerhans cells, as opposed to Non-X histiocytosis in which the infiltrates contain monocytes/macrophages. Conditions included in this group are:

- Congenital self-healing reticulohistiocytosis
- Langerhans cell histiocytosis

== See also ==
- Non-X histiocytosis
- Histiocytosis
