= Malignant histiocytosis =

Hereditary autoimmune disease

- Other names: Histiocytic medullary reticulosis
- Specialty: Oncology, angiology

Malignant histiocytosis is a rare hereditary disease found in the Bernese Mountain Dog and humans, characterized by histiocytic infiltration of the lungs and lymph nodes. The liver, spleen, and central nervous system can also be affected. Histiocytes are a component of the immune system that proliferate abnormally in this disease. In addition to its importance in veterinary medicine, the condition is also important in human pathology.

== Histiocytic disorders ==
A histiocyte is a differentiated tissue cell that has its origin in the bone marrow. The source for histiocytes is the monocyte/macrophage line. Monocytes (found in the blood) and macrophages (found in tissue) are responsible for phagocytosis (ingestion) of foreign material in the body. Langerhans cells are dendritic cells found in the skin and function by internalizing antigens (foreign particles) and presenting them to T cells. They arise from monocytes. Histiocytic disorders refer to diseases that are caused by abnormal behavior of these cells. They include the following:

- Reactive diseases of Langerhans cells (most important feature in immune histochemistry is expression of E-cadherin)
  - Histiocytomas
- Reactive histiocytosis (immunohistochemical features show that interstitial/dermal DCs are involved)
  - Cutaneous histiocytosis (CH)
  - Systemic histiocytosis (SH)
- Reactive diseases of macrophages
  - Hemophagocytic syndrome – a condition where macrophages phagocytose myeloid and erythroid precursors (similar to hemophagocytic lymphohistiocytosis in humans)
- Histiocytic sarcoma complex (immunohistochemical features of dendritic cells, possibly interdigitating or perivascular DCs)
  - Malignant histiocytosis
  - Diffuse histiocytic sarcoma
  - Localized histiocytic sarcoma
- Malignant diseases of macrophages
  - Histiocytic lymphoma

== Breed disposition ==
Up to 25 percent of Bernese Mountain Dogs may develop malignant histiocytosis in their lifetime. Other breeds with a possible genetic tendency toward malignant histiocytosis include Rottweilers, Flat-Coated Retrievers, and Golden Retrievers.

== Signs and symptoms ==
The disease in the lungs is characterized by enlargement of the tracheobronchial lymph nodes and infiltration of the lungs, sometimes leading to lung lobe consolidation and pleural effusion. Signs and symptoms include cough, loss of appetite, weight loss, anemia, and difficulty breathing. Seizures and rear limb weakness can be seen. Invasion of the bone marrow can cause pancytopenia. Diagnosis requires a biopsy.

== Treatment ==
Treatment with chemotherapy has been used with some success, particularly using lomustine, prednisone, doxorubicin, and cyclophosphamide. Because of the rapid progression of this aggressive disease, the prognosis is very poor.

== Other histiocytic diseases in Bernese Mountain Dogs ==
A similar disease is diffuse histiocytic sarcoma, a term used to designate a localized histiocytic sarcoma that has spread throughout the body. Other signs and symptoms include weight loss and loss of appetite.

== See also ==
- Histiocytosis
