= Generalized eruptive histiocytoma =

- Other names: Generalized eruptive histiocytosis
- Specialty: Dermatology

Generalized eruptive histiocytoma (also known as "Eruptive histiocytoma," and "Generalized eruptive histiocytosis") is a rare cutaneous condition characterized by widespread, erythematous, essentially symmetrical papules, particularly involving the trunk and proximal extremities.

== Signs and symptoms ==
Generalized eruptive histiocytoma is a benign, uncommon kind of histiocytosis caused by non-Langerhans cells that is characterized by symmetrically distributed, brownish or reddish grouped papules on the face, trunk, and proximal extremities. These papules often develop into flares. On the mucous membranes, the lesions are rarely visible. They often go away on their own and may regress leaving behind some hyperchromic macules.

== Diagnosis ==
Histological analysis reveals a monomorphous, devoid of foamy and giant cells, histiocytic infiltrate in the upper and mid-dermis. Studies using histochemistry and histoenzymatic analysis reveal lysosomal enzyme positivity but no intracellular buildup of fat, mucopolysaccharides, glycogen, or iron. Histiocytic cells have cytoplasmic laminated bodies but lack Birbeck granules, according to electron microscopy studies.

== See also ==
- Non-X histiocytosis
- List of cutaneous conditions
