= Hereditary progressive mucinous histiocytosis =

- This condition is inherited in an autosomal dominant manner
- Specialty: Dermatology

Hereditary progressive mucinous histiocytosis is a very rare, benign, non-Langerhans' cell histiocytosis. An autosomal dominant or X-linked hereditary disease described on the skin, it has been found almost exclusively in women. One case of the disease in a male patient has been reported.

== See also ==
- Non-X histiocytosis
