= August Schlickum =

German botanist (1867–1946)

August Schlickum (7 August 1867, in Winningen – 28 May 1946, in Cologne) was a German schoolteacher and naturalist.

== Personal life ==
Schlickum's father, Oskar Schlickum (1838–1869) and grandfather, Julius Schlickum (1804–1884) were both pharmacists and amateur botanists.

== Education ==
Schlickum studied natural sciences and mathematics at the universities of Bonn, Zürich, Berlin and Marburg, receiving his teaching degree at the latter institution in 1893.

== Career ==
Schlickum then served as an assistant under Arthur Meyer at the botanical institute in Marburg, followed by work as an instructor at schools in Aachen (1896) Essen (1897–98) and Düsseldorf (1898–99). From 1899 to 1932 he was a gymnasium teacher in Cologne.

In addition to his duties as a teacher, he carried out research in the fields of geology, paleontology and botany. In collaboration with Wiesbaden physician Karl Touton, he participated in scientific investigations of the Rhineland and the Allgäu. He supplied Touton with many Hieracium specimens from the Rhine area and was instrumental in the naming of a number of taxa within the genus. The subspecific epithet of schlickumianum honors his name.

== Selected works ==
- Morphologischer und anatomischer Vergleich der Kotyledonen und ersten Laubblätter der Keimpflanzen der Monokotylen, 1895 – Morphological and anatomical comparison of cotyledons and first leaves of monocot seedlings (In this work Schlickum gave a detailed description of wheat germ).
- Lehrbuch der Chemie und Mineralogie sowie der Elemente der Geologie : für die oberen Klassen der Oberrealschulen und Realgymnasien, 1907 – Textbook of chemistry and mineralogy as elements of geology.
- Einführung in die Chemie und Mineralogie für die Untersekunda der Oberrealschule, 1908 – Introduction of chemistry and mineralogy for the sixth year of secondary school.
- Beobachtungen an einigen einheimischen Pflanzenarten, 1911 – Observations of some native plant species.
