= Ken Hashimoto =

Japanese professor (1931–2017)

- Born: 19 June 1931; Niigata City, Japan
- Died: 9 November 2017 (aged 86)
- Education: Niigata University
- Medical career
- Profession: Dermatology
- Institutions: Wayne State University

Ken Hashimoto (橋本 健; June 19, 1931 – November 9, 2017) was a Japanese professor of dermatology who worked in the United States. He pioneered research on skin disease using electron microscopy and histochemistry.

Hashimoto was born and brought up in Niigata City, Japan, where his father was professor and dean of the Niigata University School of Medicine. After graduating in medicine, he moved to the United States in 1956, and completed his training in dermatology at the University of Maryland and Massachusetts General Hospital.

He is best remembered for his skill in using the electron microscope and histochemistry to determine the pathogenesis of Anderson-Fabry's Disease. His name is connected with two rare skin conditions, congenital self-healing reticulohistiocytosis and the blistering transient bullous dermolysis of the newborn.

In 1980, he was appointed to Wayne State University as professor. Many future dermatologists were trained by him and he wrote numerous articles, book chapters and books.

== Early life ==
Hashimoto was born on 19 June 1931, and grew up in Niigata City, Japan. His father was professor and chair of dermatology, dean of the Niigata University School of Medicine, and president of the university, where Hashimoto also graduated in medicine. His brother also became a dermatologist.

== Career ==
In 1956, Hashimoto moved to the United States. He was a Fulbright Scholar and did his residencies in dermatology at the University of Maryland and Massachusetts General Hospital.

=== Research with electron microscope ===
In 1965, he wrote his classic paper on the pathogenesis of Anderson-Fabry's disease where he demonstrated the use of an electron microscope to look at endothelial cells, smooth muscle cells, fibrocytes and perivascular cells in people with Fabry disease, a lethal "metabolic disease angikeratoma corporis diffusum". He confirmed the presence of large bodies in these cells which he described as “large residual bodies” or "extremely overcrowded lysosomes", and determined that a genetic abnormality caused a disturbance of lysosomal enzymes.

Congenital self-healing reticulohistiocytosis is also known as Hashimoto-Pritzker disease, first described by Hashimoto and Pritzker in 1973. In addition, Transient bullous dermolysis of the newborn is named after Hashimoto who first described this condition with characteristic blister formations soon after birth, followed by rapid healing with or without scarring, in 1985.

=== Wayne State University ===
He was appointed professor and chairman at Wayne State University in 1980, following faculty appointments at the University of Tennessee and Tufts University, and a position as chair of dermatology at Wright State University in Dayton, Ohio.

=== Teaching and education ===
Hashimoto taught over one hundred resident physicians and forty research fellows. He encouraged many researchers to work at his laboratory, of whom 15 rose to professorship in dermatology or anatomy in Japan. In addition, he was supportive in alleviating the anxieties of Japanese dermatology students who travelled to the United States to study.

He published 384 papers, just under 40 book chapters and eight books during his career, including one in Japanese, the Histopathology of Skin Disease, the fifth volume of which remained unfinished at the time of his death.

Together with his wife Noriko, he established the Hashimoto and Noriko Hashimoto Endowed Chair in the Department of Dermatology and Syphilology in 2007.

== Personal and family ==
Hashimoto was married to Noriko and they had four children, Naomi, Martha, Eugene and Amy.

Throughout his time in Memphis, Tennessee, Hashimoto enjoyed fishing and his motorboat, which he would drive to local rivers and lakes for an annual trip to the Gulf of Mexico. He also liked gardening and planting fruit trees. His other hobbies included farming and later feeding several types of birds in his backyard, including ducks, pheasants and peafowl. In addition, he used some of his retirement to travel frequently to Japan.

== Death and legacy ==
For many years Hashimoto suffered from recurrent falls and aspiration due to Parkinson's Disease. Hashimoto died on 9 November 2017, at the age of 86 years, at his home in Ann Arbor, Michigan. He was survived by his wife, two sisters, one brother, four children and nine grandchildren.

== Selected publications ==
=== Books ===
- Skin Pathology by Light and Electron Microscopy. Igaku-Shoin, New York, 1983. (With Kan Niizuma) ISBN 9780896400801
- Tumors of Skin Appendages. Butterworths, 1987. (With Amir H. Mehregan and Masanobu Kumakiri) ISBN 9780409951592
- Tumors of the Epidermis. Butterworths, c.1990. (With Amir H. Mehregan) ISBN 0409901636

=== Book chapters ===
- "Immunohistochemical Diagnosis of Skin Tumors", with M. Setoyama and E. Hashimoto, in Randall K. Roenigk & Henry H. Roenigk Jr. (Eds.) Surgical Dermatology: Advances in Current Practice. Martin Dunitz, London, 1993. pp. 131–138. ISBN 185317-061-5.

=== Articles ===
- Hashimoto, K; Gross, BG; Lever, WF (1965). "Angiokeratoma corporis diffusum (Fabry). Histochemical and electron microscopic studies of the skin". Journal of Investigative Dermatology. 1965: 119–28. doi:10.1038/jid.1965.22. PMID 14258908.
- Hashimoto, Ken (1973). "Electron Microscopic Study of Reticulohistiocytoma". Archives of Dermatology. 107 (2): 263. doi:10.1001/archderm.1973.01620170071020.
- Hashimoto, K; Matsumoto, M; Iacobelli, D (1985). "Transient bullous dermolysis of the newborn". Arch Dermatol. 121 (11): 1429–38. doi:10.1001/archderm.1985.01660110077020. PMID 3901931.
- Hashimoto, K; Miner, J (1996). "Electron microscopy in AIDS-related infectious diseases. I. Acanthamoebiasis". The Journal of Dermatology. 23 (11): 773–7. doi:10.1111/j.1346-8138.1996.tb02700.x. PMID 8990700. S2CID 45133472.
- Hashimoto, K; Hamzavi, I; Tanaka, K; Shwayder, T (2000). "Acral peeling skin syndrome". J Am Acad Dermatol. 43 (6): 1112–9. doi:10.1067/mjd.2000.103645. PMID 11100033.
