= Pleomorphic fibroma =

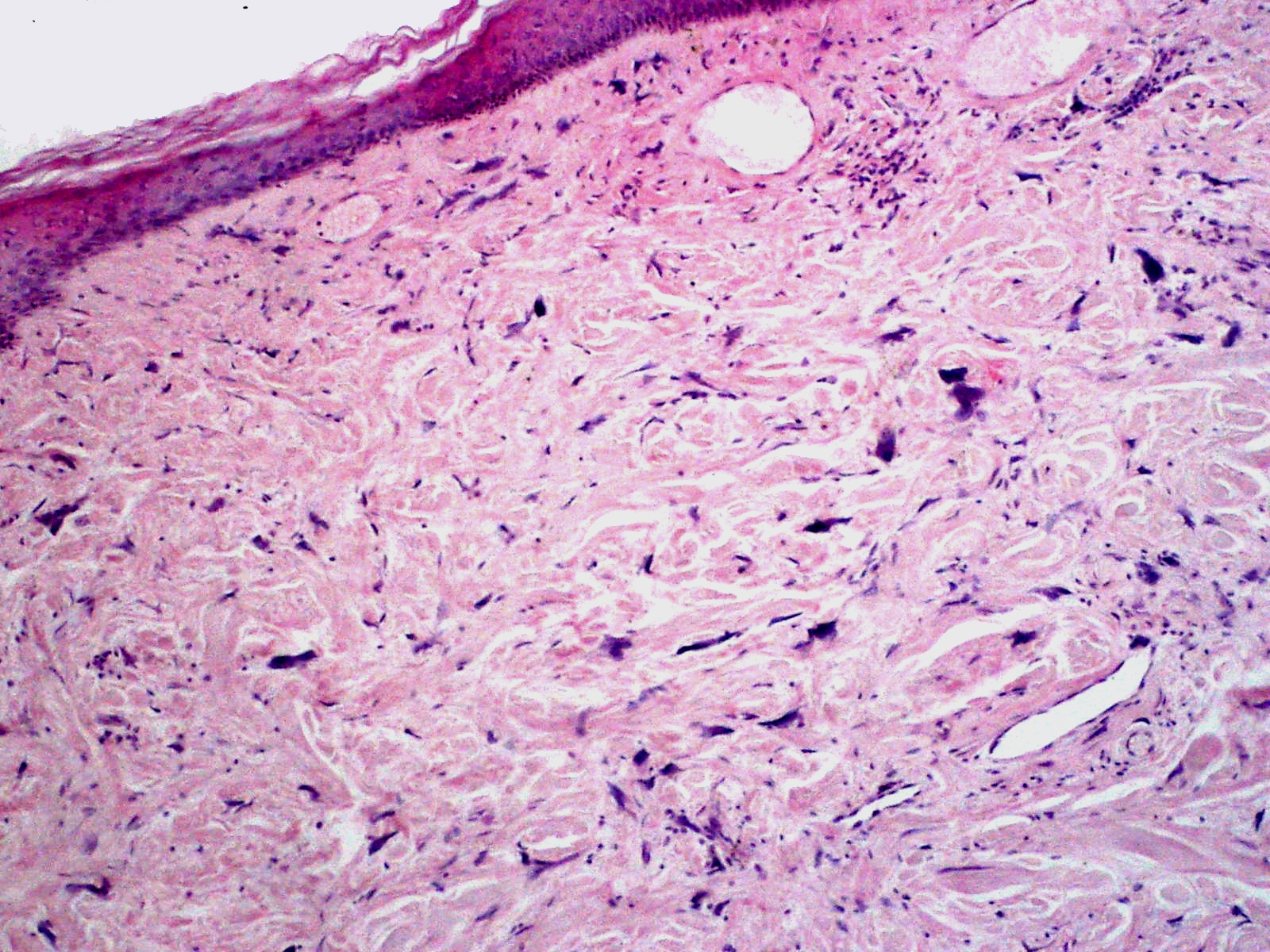
Micrograph of pleomorphic fibroma. Cell-depleted, fibrous connective tissue with atypical fibroblasts

Pleomorphic fibromas of the skin usually present in adults, with a slight preponderance in women.

== See also ==
- Pleomorphic lipoma
- List of cutaneous conditions
