= Sea-blue histiocytosis =

- Specialty: Hematology

Sea-blue histiocytosis is a cutaneous condition that may occur as a familial inherited syndrome or as an acquired secondary or systemic infiltrative process.

== Causes ==
It can be associated with the gene APOE.

It can also be acquired. Sea-blue histiocyte syndrome is seen in patients receiving fat emulsion as a part of long-term parenteral nutrition (TPN) for intestinal failure.

== Pathophysiology ==
The high lipid content in the blood leads to excessive cytoplasm loading of lipids within histiocytes.

The subsequent incomplete degradation of these lipids leads to the formation of cytoplasmic lipid pigments.

High lipid content may also cause membrane abnormality of the hemopoietic cells which is recognized by macrophages and therefore, increased accumulation within the bone marrow.

These lipid laden histiocytes appear blue with May-Giemsa/PAS stain hence the name of Sea-Blue Histocyte Syndrome. Sea-blue histiocytosis is also seen in lipid disorders.

== See also ==
- Non-X histiocytosis
