= Epithelioid cell histiocytoma =

- Specialty: Dermatology

Epithelioid cell histiocytoma is a rare skin condition that is considered to be a variant of a dermatofibroma.

== See also ==
- Pleomorphic lipoma
- List of cutaneous conditions
