= Non-X histiocytosis =

- Specialty: Dermatology

Non-X histiocytoses are a clinically well-defined group of cutaneous syndromes characterized by infiltrates of monocytes/macrophages, as opposed to X-type histiocytoses in which the infiltrates contain Langerhans cells. Conditions included in this group are:

- Juvenile xanthogranuloma
- Benign cephalic histiocytosis
- Generalized eruptive histiocytoma
- Xanthoma disseminatum
- Progressive nodular histiocytosis
- Papular xanthoma
- Hereditary progressive mucinous histiocytosis
- Reticulohistiocytosis
- Indeterminate cell histiocytosis
- Sea-blue histiocytosis
- Erdheim–Chester disease

== See also ==
- X-type histiocytosis
- Histiocytosis
