= Xanthoma disseminatum =

- Other names: Disseminated xanthosiderohistiocytosis and Montgomery syndrome
- Specialty: Endocrinology

Xanthoma disseminatum is a rare cutaneous condition that preferentially affects males in childhood, characterized by the insidious onset of small, yellow-red to brown papules and nodules that are discrete and disseminated.

It is a histiocytosis syndrome.

== See also ==
- Non-X histiocytosis
- List of cutaneous conditions
