= Congenital self-healing reticulohistiocytosis =

- Other names: Hashimoto–Pritzker disease, and Hashimoto–Pritzker syndrome
- Specialty: Dermatology

Congenital self-healing reticulohistiocytosis is a condition that is a self-limited form of Langerhans cell histiocytosis.

== Symptoms ==
Non-specific inflammatory response, which includes fever, lethargy, and weight loss. This is suspected of being a genetic disorder, and as the name implies, is self healing.

- Skin: Commonly seen are a rash which varies from scaly erythematous lesions to red papules pronounced in intertriginous areas. Up to 80% of patients have extensive eruptions on the scalp.
- Lymph node: Enlargement of the lymph nodes in 50% of Histiocytosis cases.

== History ==
It was first described by Ken Hashimoto and Martin S. Pritzker in 1973.

== See also ==
- List of cutaneous conditions
- X-type histiocytosis
