= Benign cephalic histiocytosis =

- Other names: Histiocytosis with intracytoplasmic worm-like bodies
- Specialty: Hematology

Benign cephalic histiocytosis (BCH) is a non-Langerhan's histiocytosis that is uncommon and self-limiting, usually beginning towards the end of the first year of life. Gianotti et al. originally described it in 1971. Initially affecting the head and neck, this condition is characterized by several small eruptions of yellow to reddish-brown papules that heal on their own. Histological investigations have demonstrated that this disorder is associated with dermal proliferation of histiocytes, characterized by intracytoplasmic comma-shaped bodies, covered vesicles, and desmosome-like structure.

== Signs and symptoms ==
The patient presents with asymptomatic macules and papules measuring approximately 8 mm in diameter. The colors of the lesions range from yellow to red-brown, and they primarily affect the face and neck. Subsequently, lesions may spread to the buttocks, upper and lower extremities.

== Diagnosis ==
A well-circumscribed histiocytic infiltrate is found in the superficial and middle reticular dermis of the biopsy specimen of the BCH early lesion, occasionally accompanied by lymphocytes and eosinophils. The older lesions display some enormous cells with lymphocytes and nuclei arranged peripherally.

== Treatment ==
Treatment is not necessary because lesions usually go away on their own by the time a child is 2 to 8 years old, though they frequently leave behind permanent post-inflammatory hyperpigmentation.

== Epidemiology ==
BCH usually manifests itself between the ages of 2 and 34 months and, less frequently, up to 5 years. Both men and women are equally impacted. As of 2022 about 70 cases have been described in literature.

== See also ==
- Childhood granulomatous periorificial dermatitis
- Non-X histiocytosis
