= Touton giant cell =

Cell type

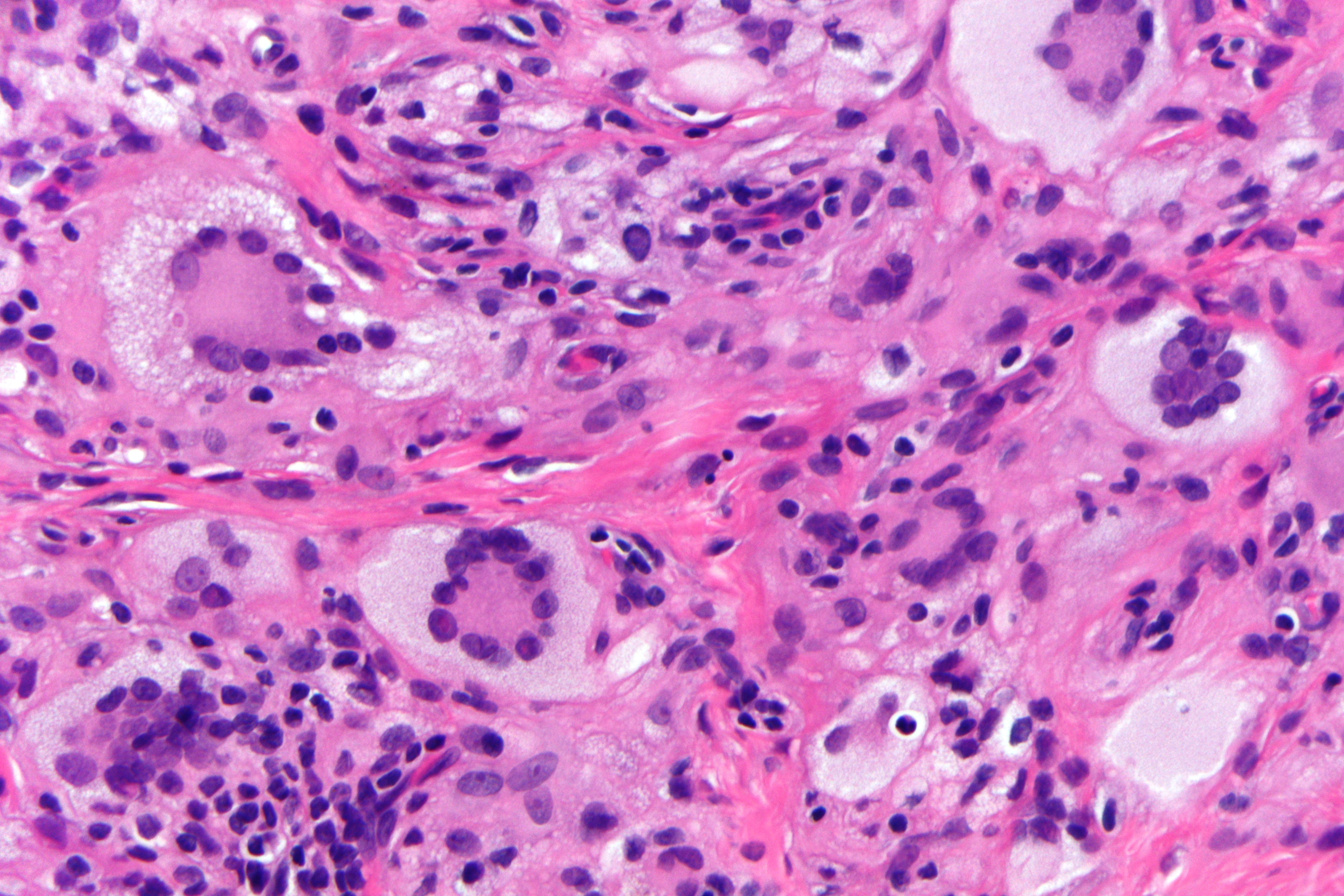
Touton giant cells in a juvenile xanthogranuloma. H&E stain.

Touton giant cells are a type of multinucleated giant cell observed in a myriad of pathological disorders and conditions. Specifically, Touton giant cells are found in lipid-rich lesions such as those of fat necrosis, xanthoma, xanthelasma and xanthogranulomas. Touton giant cells are also referred to as xanthelasmatic cells due to the fact they are found in lesions associated with xanthomas which are skin growths with yellow, lipid filled deposits. Touton giant cells are often frequently observed in granulomatous inflammation, which is a type of inflammation caused by the clustering of immune cells, or granulomas. They are also found in dermatofibroma. Touton giant cells are commonly characterized by their unique histological appearance as well as their response to various stimuli associated with the body's immune system.

== History ==
Touton giant cells are named for Karl Touton, a German botanist and dermatologist. Karl Touton first observed these cells in 1885 and named them "xanthelasmatic giant cells", a name which has since fallen out of favor. Karl Touton observed these giant cells when examining a biopsy or skin tissue sample from someone with a lesion under a microscope. He then classified and named these cells due to their strikingly unique appearance. Touton giant cells are still observed using these methods as well as staining with histological dyes such as hematoxylin and eosin (H&E).

== Appearance ==
Touton giant cells, being multinucleated giant cells, can be distinguished by the presence of several nuclei in a distinct pattern. This pattern is described as a ring-like or wreath-like in the center of a cell. These cells contain a ring of nuclei surrounding a central homogeneous cytoplasm, while foamy cytoplasm surrounds the nuclei. The cytoplasm is usually lipid-rich and has a foamy appearance. The cytoplasm is divided into two distinct areas: the peripheral zone and the central zone. The central zone is the cytoplasm surrounded by the nuclei which is described as both amphophilic and eosinophilic. Meanwhile, the cytoplasm near the periphery of the cell, the peripheral zone, is pale and contains vacuoles due to the lipid content in this zone of the cell.

== Activation and macrophage relationship ==
Touton giant cells are formed by the fusion of macrophage-derived foam cells. It has been suggested that cytokines (signaling molecules) such as interferon gamma, interleukin-3, interleukin-6 (IL-6) and M-CSF may be involved in the production of Touton giant cells. Specifically, Touton giant cells are said to be derived from macrophages that aid directly in reducing inflammation. They have reparative behavior and by using IL-6, a cytokine, these cells are activated and able to perform tissue repair. Although the specific fusion molecule associated with fusing macrophages to form Touton giant cells is not very well understood, it seems as though there is an association with the activation of Toll-like receptors (TLRs). Further proof that these Touton giant cells are histiocytic in origin, meaning they arise from a macrophage-lineage cell, is the fact they react positively to enzymes found in histiocytes such as lysozyme, alpha 1-anti-trypsin and alpha 1-anti-chymotrypsin. Touton giant cells are able to express these proteins which are involved in actions such as regulation of tissue damage, tissue breakdown, inflammation and more, which are common actions of a Touton giant cell.

== Correspondence with immune system ==
Touton giant cells are considered white blood cells due to their role in the immune system as well as where they are derived from. These multinucleated giant cells are formed by the fusion of macrophages, a type of white blood cell that has many functions such as removing dead cells and stimulating the action of other immune cells. Macrophages are derived from monocytes, white blood cells that aid in destroying bacteria and germs to prevent infection. These monocytes arise from the myeloid stem cell line. Touton giant cells aim to remove harmful substances in the tissue in which they are from. They do so by engulfing and degrading large foreign materials such as lipids in the lesions they are found in, most commonly in areas of fat necrosis.

== Associated conditions ==
Conditions associated with Touton giant cells are ones that involve lipid metabolism or chronic inflammation. Some of these conditions include xanthomas: lesions that are seen in hyperlipidemia; xanthogranuloma: benign skin lesions; fat necrosis: areas of trauma where adipose tissue has been disrupted; dermatofibrosa: benign skin tumor characterized by fibrous components; granulomatous diseases such as sarcoidosis.
