= Prolactin-induced protein =

Mammalian protein found in Homo sapiens

PIP
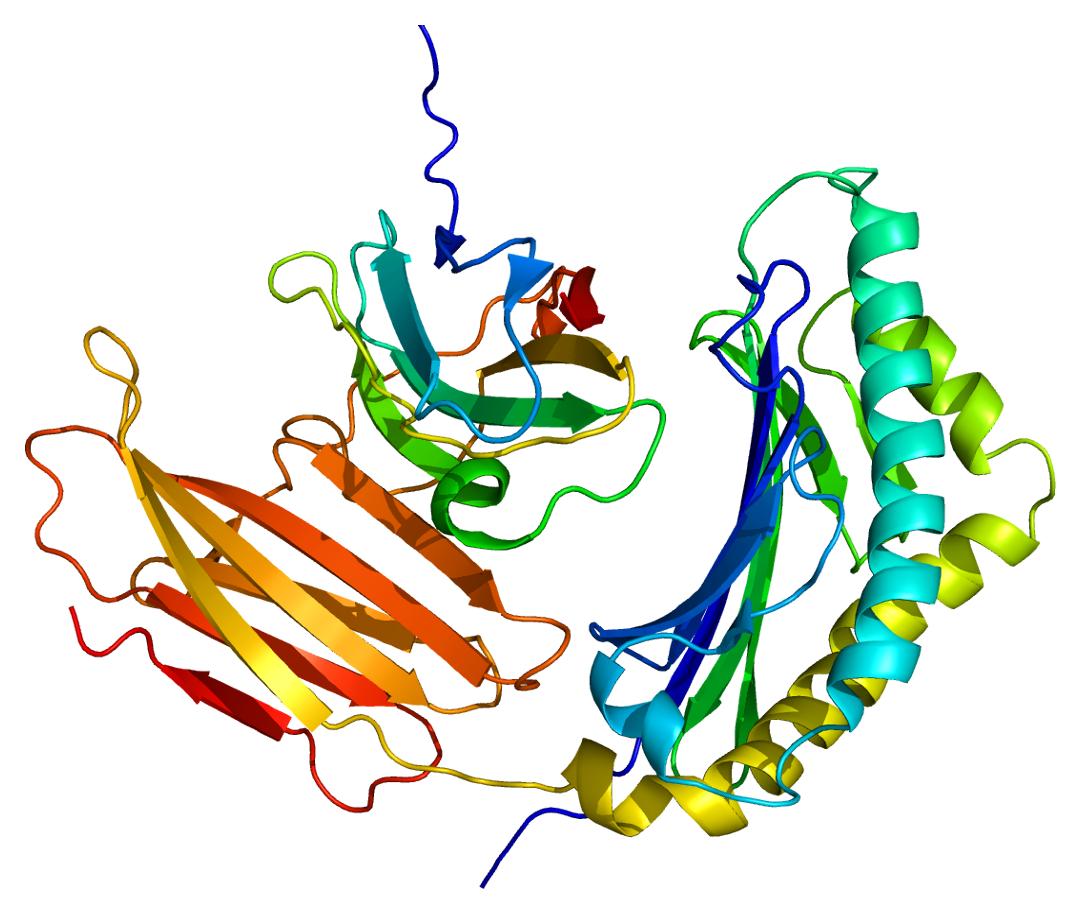
Available structures
PDB	Ortholog search: PDBe RCSB
PDB	List of PDB id codes 3ES6

Identifiers
- Aliases: PIP, GCDFP-15, GCDFP15, GPIP4, Prolactin-induced protein, prolactin induced protein, BRST-2
- External IDs: OMIM: 176720; MGI: 102696; HomoloGene: 1990; GeneCards: PIP; OMA:PIP - orthologs

Gene location (Human)
Chr.	Chromosome 7 (human)
Band	7q34	Start	143,132,077 bp
Band	7q34	End	143,139,739 bp

Gene location (Mouse)
Chr.	Chromosome 6 (mouse)
Band	6 B2.1|6 20.05 cM	Start	41,824,469 bp
Band	6 B2.1|6 20.05 cM	End	41,828,999 bp
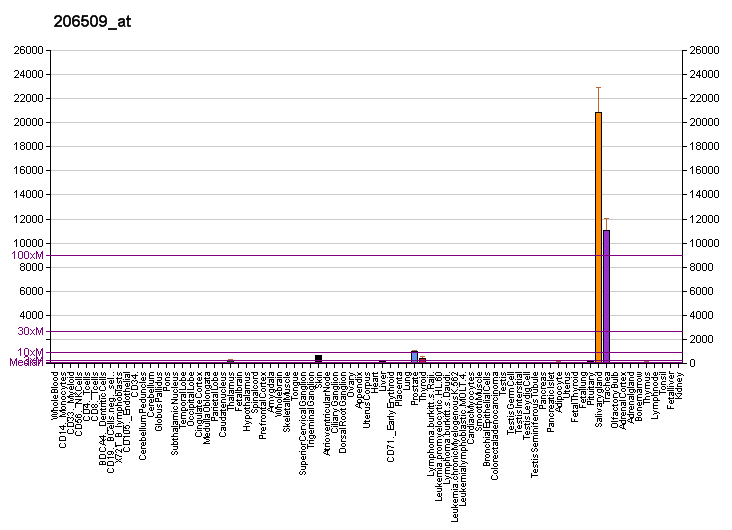
RNA expression pattern
Bgee	Human / Mouse (ortholog); Top expressed in: seminal vesicula; parotid gland; olfactory zone of nasal mucosa; trachea; skin of thigh; palpebral conjunctiva; skin of arm; sperm; skin of hip; lactiferous duct / Top expressed in: parotid gland; lacrimal gland; submandibular gland; temporal muscle; olfactory epithelium; masseter muscle; sexually immature organism; digastric muscle; lymph node; trachea; More reference expression data
BioGPS	More reference expression data
Gene ontology
Molecular function	actin binding; protein binding; protein dimerization activity; IgG binding; aspartic-type endopeptidase activity
Cellular component	extracellular region; apical plasma membrane; extracellular exosome; nucleus; extracellular space
Biological process	negative regulation of T cell apoptotic process; regulation of immune system process; retina homeostasis; positive regulation of gene expression; detection of chemical stimulus involved in sensory perception of bitter taste; transmembrane transport; proteolysis
Sources:Amigo / QuickGO
Orthologs
Species	Human	Mouse
Entrez	5304	18716
Ensembl	ENSG00000159763	ENSMUSG00000058499
UniProt	P12273	P02816
RefSeq (mRNA)	NM_002652	NM_008843
RefSeq (protein)	NP_002643	NP_032869
Location (UCSC)	Chr 7: 143.13 – 143.14 Mb	Chr 6: 41.82 – 41.83 Mb
PubMed search
- Wikidata
View/Edit Human	View/Edit Mouse

Prolactin-inducible protein also known as gross cystic disease fluid protein 15 (GCDFP-15), extra-parotid glycoprotein (EP-GP), gp17 seminal actin-binding protein (SABP) or BRST2 is a protein that in humans is encoded by the PIP gene. It is upregulated by prolactin and androgens and downregulated by estrogen.

== Function ==
The protein has a physiological function in regulation of water transport mainly in apocrine glands in the axilla, vulva, eyelid and ear canal, serous cells of the submandibular salivary gland, serous cells of the submucosal glands of the bronchi, and accessory lacrimal glands as well as cutaneous eccrine glands. It is also found in amniotic fluid and seminal fluid.

PIP has the ability to bind immunoglobulin G (IgG), IgG-Fc, CD4-T cell receptor suggesting a wide range of immunological functions. PIP also binds to AZGP1. PIP exerts aspartyl proteinase activity able to cleave fibronectin.

PIP can bind different species of bacteria showing highest affinity to streptococci thus playing a role in non-immune defense of the body against pathogenic bacterial strains.

Mitogenic effect of PIP was observed on both normal and malignant breast epithelial cells.

== Use as marker and significance in disease ==
Prolactin induced protein (called GCDFP-15 in this context) in breast cyst fluid or breast tissue serves as marker of both benign and malignant apocrine metaplasia as the protein is not normally expressed in breast tissue. It is characteristic of low grade apocrine carcinoma of the breast, high grade apocrine carcinoma frequently lose expression of this marker. PIP gene expression in breast cancer lines was associated with decreased cell proliferation and invasiveness and an increase of the apoptotic pathway. Many of the genes affected by PIP appear to be regulated by STAT5.

A mitogenic effect of this protein on experimental breast cells lines MCF10A, MCF7, BT474, MDA-MB231 and T47D was detected. Prolactin-induced protein has also been used for identification and detection of disseminated breast cancer cells.

The PIP gene is amplified in some breast cancer lines accounting for some of its overexpression, however additional mechanisms are needed to completely explain its overexpression. In T47D breast cancer cells, androgen receptor and RUNX2 interact to synergistically enhance PIP expression.

In molecular apocrine breast cancer (ER-/AR+) there is a positive feedback loop between androgen receptor and extracellular signal-regulated kinase (ERK) via CREB1 which can be inhibited by anti-androgens. PIP expression is necessary for viability and invasiveness of this subtype of breast cancer.

In ER+ breast cancer, particularly those with very high level of ER expression, PIP appears to play an important role in proliferation and invasion as well as acquired resistance to tamoxifen.
