= Pleomorphic lipoma =

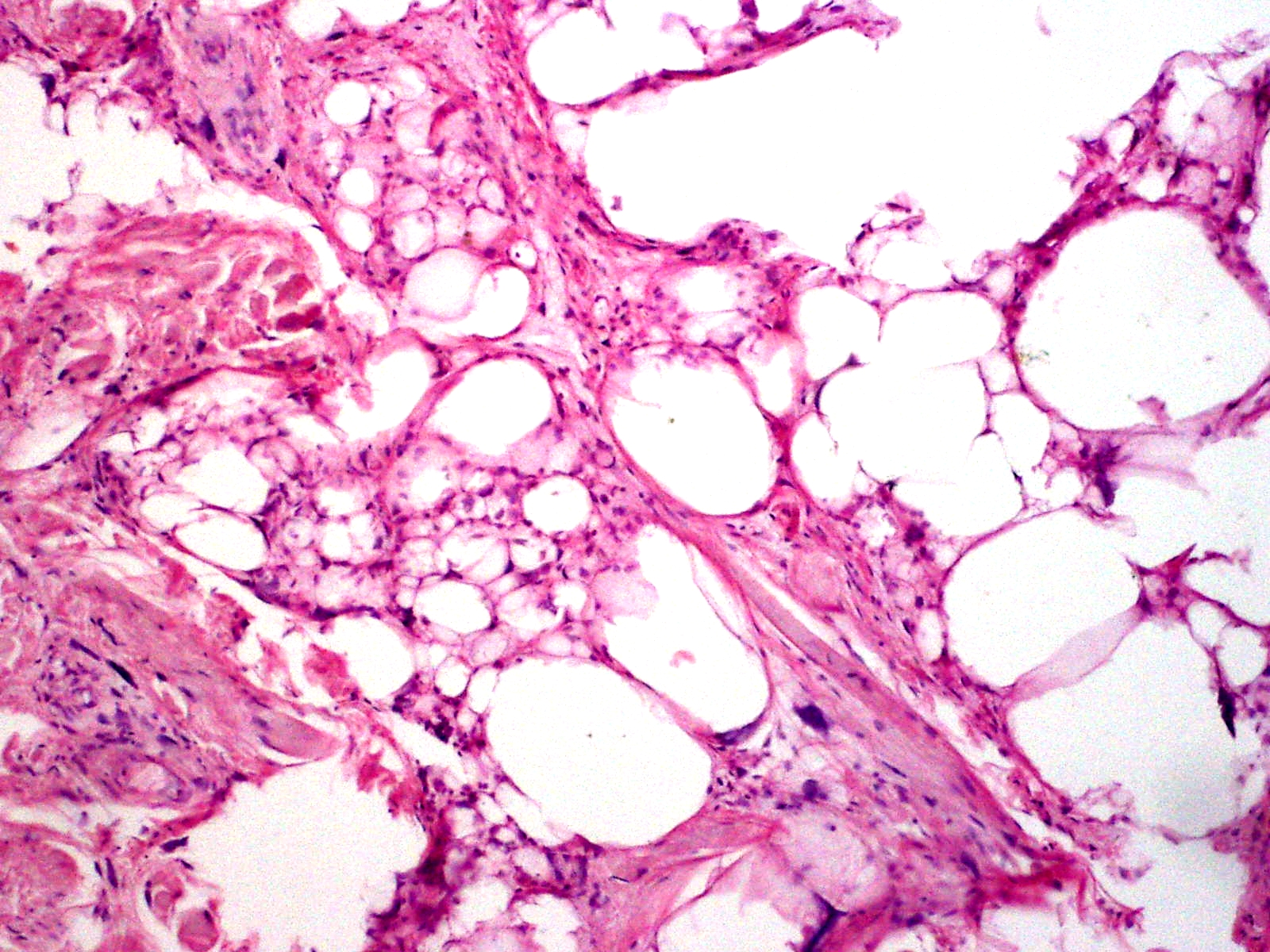
- Pleomorphic lipoma
- Specialty: Oncology

Pleomorphic lipomas, like spindle-cell lipomas, occur for the most part on the backs and necks of elderly men, and are characterized by floret giant cells with overlapping nuclei.

== Signs and symptoms ==
Most cases of pleomorphic lipoma are seen in the subcutaneous tissue of the back, shoulder, and posterior neck. Less commonly, it can also happen in odd places like the tongue, vulva, palm, tonsillar fossa, orbit, and oral cavity. The lesion usually presents as a subcutaneous lump that is circumscribed, like the common lipoma.

== Diagnosis ==
Histologically, bland spindle mesenchymal cells and mature fat make up the majority of the tissue in pleomorphic lipoma. Furthermore, multinucleated large cells with radically positioned nuclei in a "floret-like" pattern are strewn among the spindle cells. The histological spectrum is rather diverse, ranging from a tumor that primarily consists of spindle cells with only a few fat cells to a tumor that resembles an average lipoma with few spindle cells. Cytologically, multinucleated large cells feature irregular, hyperchromatic, and considerably unusual nuclei, while spindle cells have single elongated hyperchromatic nuclei and inconspicuous nucleoli. The two cell types' mitoses are uncommon. Collagen bands that resemble ropes are sporadically spaced throughout the cellular components and are typically a crucial diagnostic indicator for pleomorphic lipoma.

== See also ==
- Lipoma
- List of cutaneous conditions
