= Scleredema =

- Other names: Buschke disease, Scleredema of Buschke, and Scleredema adultorum
- Specialty: Rheumatology, pediatrics

Scleredema is a rare, self-limiting skin condition defined by progressive thickening and hardening of the skin, usually on the areas of the upper back, neck, shoulders and face. The skin may also change color to red or orange. The disease was discovered by Abraham Buschke. Although the cause of scleredema is unknown, it is usually associated with a disease, usually diabetes, a viral illness or strep throat. It is usually not fatal, but it may cause death if the disease spreads to the internal organs. It may also cause an infection.

== Diagnosis ==
The scleredema is usually proposed as a diagnosis based on the appearance of the skin and the patient's medical history. To confirm the diagnosis, the doctor performs a skin biopsy, in which hematoxylin and eosin staining will show a thick reticular dermis with thick collagen bundles separated by clear spaces. The patient's blood may be examined for diseases that may appear after the onset of symptoms, such as multiple myeloma.

== Treatment ==
Although many types of medications have been tried as treatments, none of them have been proven effective in treating scleredema. Those treatments, such as corticosteroids, may benefit the patient, but will not cure their condition. If the affected area is infected, it is usually treated immediately. The symptoms of the condition usually resolve within six months to two years after onset. However, patients whose condition was associated to diabetes may suffer for longer periods of time.

Myocarditis resulting as a complication from the disease has been successfully treated with penicillin and steroids.

== See also ==
- Necrobiosis lipoidica
