= Indeterminate cell histiocytosis =

- Other names: Indeterminate dendritic cell tumor
- Specialty: Dermatology

Indeterminate cell histiocytosis (LCH) is an uncommon proliferative illness where the predominant cells have characteristics from both non-Langerhans cell histiocytosis (NLCH) and Langerhans cell histiocytosis (LCH) in terms of morphology and immunophenotypic characteristics. Wood et al. originally described ICH in 1985 as a neoplastic disease arising from dermal indeterminate cells that lack Birbeck granules but are characteristically positive for S-100 and CD1a.

== Signs and symptoms ==
Clinically, ICH is defined by pink to reddish, varying-sized, painless, non-itching papules or nodules that develop on otherwise healthy skin (sparing mucosae). These lesions can appear as a single, distinct group of lesions, or several generalized papules dispersed over the trunk, face, and limbs. They can also show signs of stable disease, remission and recurrence, or spontaneous remission.

== Causes ==
Possible causes include scabies, mosquito bites, and a clonal drive.

== Treatment ==
Treatment include 5% 5-fluorouracil cream, topical pure coal tar, electron beam therapy, phototherapy, and total excision.

== See also ==
- Non-X histiocytosis
- List of cutaneous conditions
