= Spindle cell lipoma =

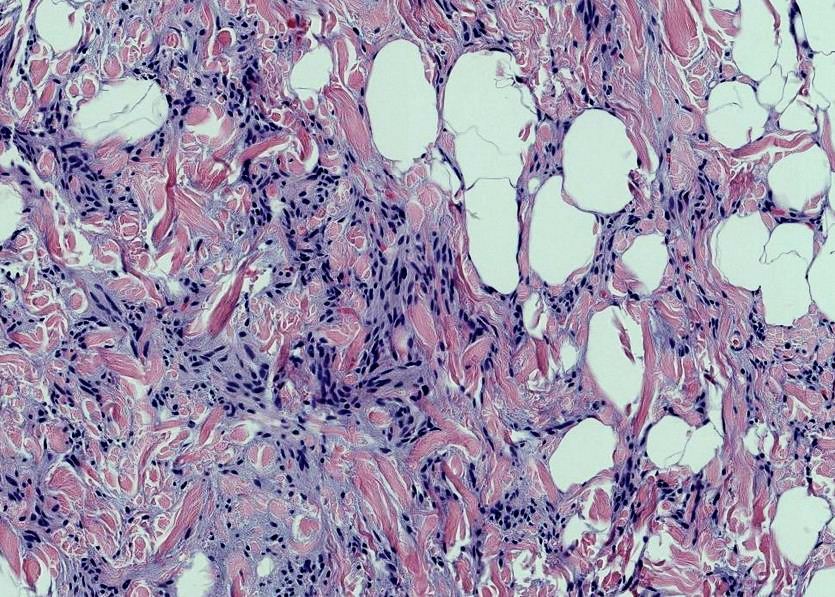
- Photomicrograph of a spindle cell lipoma.
- Specialty: Dermatology

Spindle cell lipoma is an asymptomatic, slow-growing subcutaneous tumor that has a predilection for the posterior back, neck, and shoulders of older men.

== Signs and symptoms ==
Spindle cell lipoma is most frequently located in the upper back, shoulder, or posterior neck subcutaneous layer. Nonetheless, reports of it occurring in the mediastinum, hypopharynx, larynx, anterior neck, suprasellar region, esophagus, nasal vestibule, tongue, floor of mouth, vallecula, parotid gland, and breast have been made. The tumor is said to have an average diameter of 4 to 5 cm and is growing slowly. Usually, the tumor is painless and solitary. There have been documented rare instances of numerous lesions, including family occurrences.

== Causes ==
The exact cause of spindle cell lipoma is unknown.

== Diagnosis ==
The diagnosis of spindle cell lipoma is mainly made in conjunction with clinical presentation and after other malignant tumors have been ruled out using cytologic, histologic, and cytogenetic evidence.

According to histology, the lesion is made up of tiny, homogeneous spindle cells and mature adipocytes combined with eosinophilic collagen bundles inside a myxoidstroma. According to immunohistochemical staining, the spindle cells are positive for CD34 but negative for S-100 protein.

== See also ==
- List of cutaneous conditions
