= Multicentric reticulohistiocytosis =

- Specialty: Dermatology

Multicentric reticulohistiocytosis is a multisystem disease beginning usually around the age of 50 years, and is twice as common in women.

== See also ==
- Reticulohistiocytosis
- List of cutaneous conditions
