= Necrobiotic xanthogranuloma =

Multisystem disease

- Other names: Necrobiotic xanthogranuloma with paraproteinemia
- Specialty: Dermatology

Necrobiotic xanthogranuloma, also known as necrobiotic xanthogranuloma with paraproteinemia, is a multisystem disease that affects older adults, and is characterized by prominent skin findings.

== See also ==
- List of cutaneous conditions
