= Infantile digital fibromatosis =

Benign small tumor on the finger or toe of an infant

- Other names: Inclusion body fibromatosis, Infantile digital myofibroblastoma, Reye's tumor
- Specialty: Pediatrics, Dermatology
- Usual onset: Typically at birth or infancy
- Causes: Unknown
- Prognosis: Excellent
- Frequency: Rare

Infantile digital fibromatosis (IDF), also termed inclusion body fibromatosis or Reye's tumor, usually occurs as a single, small, asymptomatic, nodule in the dermis on a finger or toe of infants and young children. IDF is a rare disorder with approximately 200 cases reported in the medical literature as of 2021. The World Health Organization in 2020 classified these nodules as a specific benign tumor type in the category of fibroblastic and myofibroblastic tumors. IDF was first described by the Australian pathologist Douglas Reye in 1965.

IDF consists of an overgrowth of spindle-shaped cells in a collagen fiber-rich background located in the dermis (i.e. the layer of skin between the epidermis and subcutaneous tissue) but may extend into the subcutaneous tissue. These spindle-shaped cells contain distinctive inclusion bodies within their cytoplasm that greatly help in distinguishing IDF from other fibrous skin diseases. These inclusions are composed of densely packed vimentin and actin filaments.

IDF lesions are usually painless and have a tendency to regress spontaneously. Consequently, the current recommended treatment for IDF nodules is conservative observation. If the lesions cause local deformities and/or functional impairments or continue to increase in size over long observation periods, surgical removal is recommended. However, surgically removed IDF lesions have had high rates of recurrence and this surgery may cause post-operative digital deformities.

== Presentation ==
IDF typically presents as a solitary painless, smooth, flesh-colored to red, dome-shaped nodule located on the dorsal or lateral aspect of a finger or toe but sparing the thumb or great toe; they occur principally in the first two years of life with about one-third of cases having a lesion since birth. However: 1) lesions with appearances similar to, and diagnosed as, IPF have been described in extra digital sites such as the arm, breast, tongue, thigh, and chest; 2) unusual cases have presented with multiple lesions, i.e. 2–3, uncommonly 7–15, and one case with 74 lesions in a 2018 review study; 3) cases have been reported in children up to the age 10 and one case was reported in a 52-year-old adult; 4) the lesions are typically smaller than 2 cm in maximum diameter but rarely have been tumor-sized, e.g. 4.5 cm; 5) the lesions, particularly when larger-sized, may be painful and/or compromise the functions of nearby joints and digits; and 6) the lesions occasionally invade the periosteum and erode a nearby bone.

== Pathology ==
Microscopic histopathological analyses of appropriately dye-stained IDF tissues typically show a non-encapsulated small tumor composed of bundles of uniform spindle-shaped cells that combine physical features of fibroblasts (the most common cell type in connective tissue) with those of myofibroblasts (contractile, spindle-shaped cells that are identifiable by their expression of α-smooth muscle actin) in a background of collagen fibers. In hematoxylin and eosin-stained tissues, the spindle-shaped cells have pale eosinophilic (i.e. red or pink due to uptake of eosin) cytoplasm with plump and elongated nuclei composed of granulated (i.e. having many small, distinct parts) chromatin. The most pathognomonic (i.e. indicative of a particular disease) feature of these cells is the presence of cytoplasmic perinuclear inclusion bodies which usually are small, round, pale pink bodies on hematoxylin and eosin staining that often indent their parent cells' nuclei. These inclusions are composed of densely packed vimentin and actin filaments. Newer tumors show relatively abundant inclusion bodies and scarce collagen fibers while older tumors show few or no detectable inclusion bodies and abundant collagen fibers. Immunohistochemical analyses show that the spindle-shaped cells typically express α-smooth muscle actin, calponin, desmin, and CD99 proteins but not S100 protein or glial fibrillary acidic protein.

== Diagnosis ==
The diagnosis of IDF is usually based on its presentation in newborn or young infants and biopsy or fine needle aspirate analyses of the tumors' pathology. These analyses should show the presence of spindle-shaped cells bearing eosinophilic paranuclear inclusions consisting of actin and vimentin filaments, which, if necessary, can be confirmed by immunofluorescence staining of the filaments. Inclusions may not be evident in older lesions stained with hematoxylin and eosin but may be apparent when stained with other reagents such as the Masson's trichrome stain, phosphotungstic acid-haematoxylin stain, elastic Van Gieson's stain, or Lendrum's phloxine-tartrazine stain. Demonstration of these filaments is not necessary for a diagnosis of IMF if the clinical picture and other histological findings are consistent with the disorder. Findings of one or a few usually small lesions centered in the dermis of a digit consisting of spindle-shaped cells and expressing α-smooth muscle actin, desmin, and calponin proteins would support the diagnosis of IDF.

Infantile myofibromatosis (IMF) is, like IDF, a disease in which benign tumors develop primarily in the fingers and toes of newborns and infants and consists of spindle-shaped cells in a collagen fibrous background. IDF was once regarded as a sub-type of infantile myofibromatosis. However, IMF tumors can be far more aggressive than IDF lesions and consist of cells that do not have paranuclear inclusions. The World Health Organization (2020) classification includes IDF but not IMF as a tumor in the category of benign fibroblastic and myofibroblastic tumors.

== Treatment ==
Infantile digital fibroma lesions were once thought to be potentially malignant and therefore treated with surgical excision and even digital amputations. Currently, these tumors are known to be benign, may spontaneously regress, and often recur after surgical removal. Consequently, IDF lesions are usually treated by a watchful waiting observation approach with surgical resections limited to cases with functional impairment, significant symptoms, or progressive, long-term growth. Alternate or supplemental treatments used to treat IDF include injection of the glucocorticoid, triamcinolone, or the chemotherapy drug, 5-fluorouracil, directly into the lesions. Since these injection treatments have not been evaluated in large studies to date, surgical resection is the most accepted treatment of highly symptomatic or progressively enlarging IDF lesions. Overall, the prognosis for IDF is excellent.

== See also ==
- Infantile fibromatosis
- Skin lesion
