= Histiocytosis =

Overproduction of histiocytes by the immune system

- Specialty: Hematology

In medicine, histiocytosis is an excessive number of histiocytes (tissue macrophages), and the term is also often used to refer to a group of rare diseases which share this sign as a characteristic. Occasionally and confusingly, the term histiocytosis is sometimes used to refer to individual diseases.

According to the Histiocytosis Association, 1 in 200,000 children in the United States are born with histiocytosis each year. HAA also states that most of the people diagnosed with histiocytosis are children under the age of 10, although the disease can afflict adults. The disease usually occurs from birth to age 15.

Histiocytosis (and malignant histiocytosis) are both important in veterinary as well as human pathology.

== Diagnosis ==
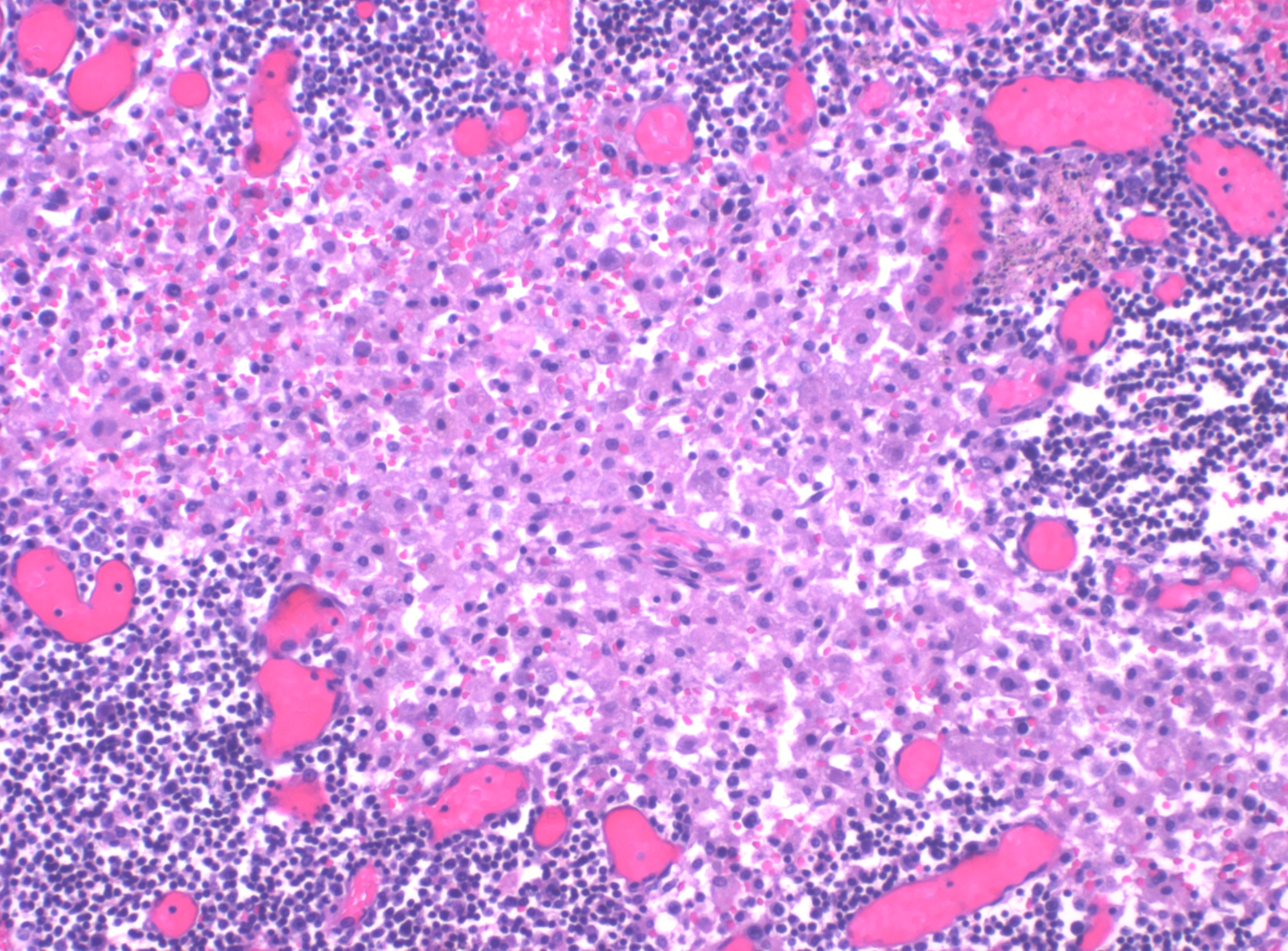
Sinus histiocytosis, a common feature in lymph node biopsies, is characterized by dilated sinuses containing variable numbers of histiocytes.

Histiocytosis is a rare disease, thus its diagnosis may be challenging. A variety of tests may be used, including:

- Imaging
  - CT scans of various organs such as lung, heart and kidneys.
  - MRI of the brain, pituitary gland, heart, among other organs.
  - Skeletal survey is useful in children
  - Ultrasound of liver and spleen
- Blood tests: measure cell counts and inflammation
- Breathing tests
- Tissue biopsy and molecular testing to detect mutations

== Classification ==
There are competing systems for classifying histiocytoses. According to the 1999 classification proposed by the World Health Organization, they can be divided into three categories. However, the classifications in ICD10 and MeSH are slightly different, as shown below:

Name	WHO	ICD10	MeSH
Langerhans cell histiocytosis (LCH)	I	D76.0	Langerhans-cell histiocytosis
Juvenile xanthogranuloma (JXG)	II	D76.3	non-Langerhans-cell histiocytosis
Hemophagocytic lymphohistiocytosis (HLH)	II	D76.1	non-Langerhans-cell histiocytosis
Niemann–Pick disease	II	E75.2	non-Langerhans-cell histiocytosis
Sea-blue histiocytosis	II	–	non-Langerhans-cell histiocytosis
Acute monocytic leukemia	III	C93.0	malignant histiocytic disorders
Malignant histiocytosis	III	C96.1	malignant histiocytic disorders
Erdheim–Chester disease	II	C96.1	malignant histiocytic disorders

Alternatively, histiocytoses may be divided into the following groups:

- X-type histiocytoses
- Non-X histiocytoses

Lymphohistiocytosis is a similar immune system disease characterized by the inappropriate activation of natural killer cells, CD8+ cytotoxic T-cells, and macrophages, involving principally the liver, spleen and central nervous system and associated with severe lymphoid atrophy.

== Treatments ==
Various treatments exist for histiocytosis. The one selected depends on the location of the disease and the patient history. The modalities used may include:

- Chemotherapy
  - Cladribine (also known as 2CDA or Leustatin)
  - Etoposide
  - Methotrexate
  - 6-mercaptopurine
  - Vinblastine
- Surgery
- Radiation therapy

== Society ==
Patients and families can gain support and educational materials from the Histiocytosis Association.

The Histiocyte Society, a nonprofit organization, is a group of more than 200 physicians and scientists from around the world committed to improving the lives of patients with histiocytic disorders by conducting clinical and laboratory research into the causes and treatment of this disease. The Society has instituted several clinical trials and treatment plans.

The North American Consortium for Histiocytosis (NACHO) is a group of institutions that collaborate on scientific and clinical research for histiocytic diseases. Established in 2014 by 12 institutions, it was funded through a consortium grant from the St. Baldrick's Foundation.
