= Juvenile xanthogranuloma =

- Other names: JXG
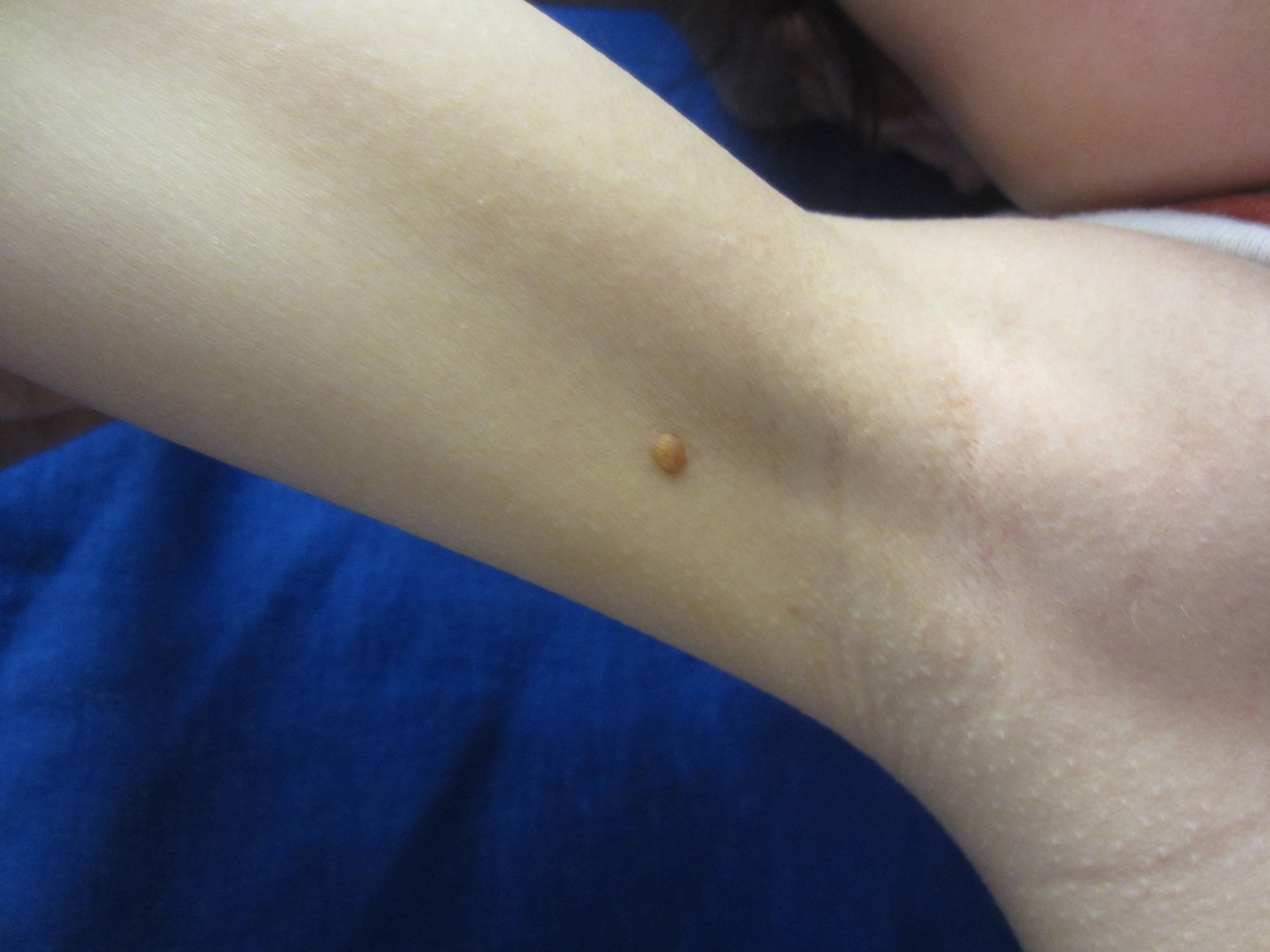
- Yellow papule on the right inner arm of a toddler
- Specialty: Hematology

Juvenile xanthogranuloma is a form of histiocytosis, classified as non-Langerhans cell histiocytosis. It is a rare skin disorder that primarily affects children under one year of age but can also be found in older children and adults.

It was first described in 1905 by Adamson. In 5% to 17% of people, the disorder is present at birth, but the median age of onset is two years. JXG is a benign idiopathic cutaneous granulomatous tumor and the most common form of non-Langerhans cell histiocytosis (non-LHC). The lesions appear as orange-red macules or papules and are usually located on the face, neck, and upper trunk. They may also appear at the groin, scrotum, penis, clitoris, toenail, palms, soles, lips, lungs, bone, heart, and gastrointestinal tract more rarely. JXG usually manifests with multiple lesions on the head and neck in cases with children under six months of age. The condition usually resolves spontaneously over one to five years. A biopsy of the lesion is critical to confirm the diagnosis.

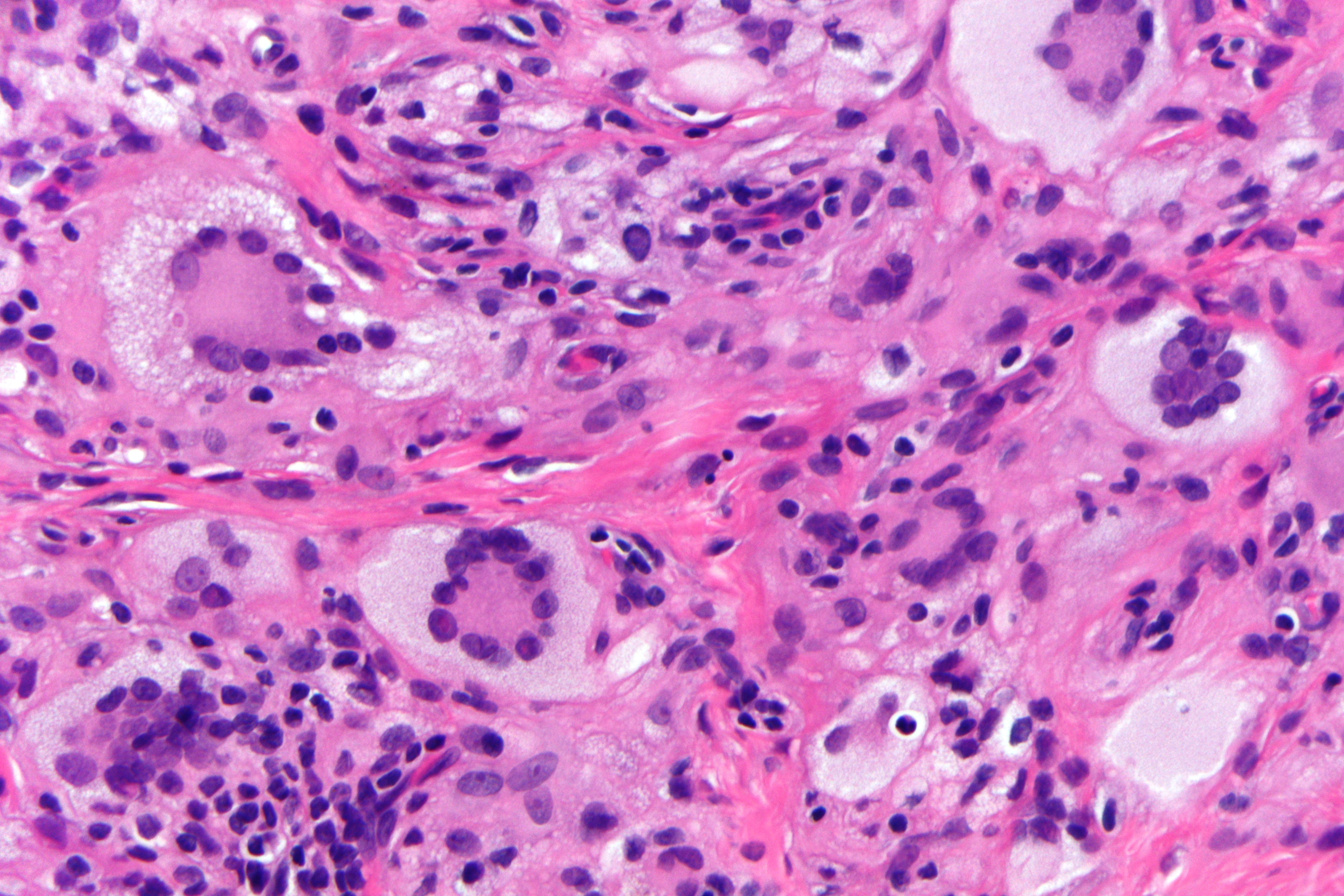
Histopathology of juvenile xanthogranuloma characteristiclaly shows scattered Touton giant cells.

Ocular JXG manifests in up to 10% of people with JXG and may affect their vision. The presence of JXG in the eye can cause spontaneous hyphema, secondary glaucoma or even blindness. It is most often seen in the iris but may be found on the eyelid, corneoscleral limbus, conjunctiva, orbit, retina, choroid, optic disc, or optic nerve. Of patients with ocular JXG, 92% are younger than the age of two. Although cutaneous JXG usually disappear spontaneously, ocular lesions rarely improve spontaneously and require treatment. Treatments that have been used include surgical excision, intralesional steroid injection, cryotherapy, and low dose radiotherapy. In the case of a resistant or reoccurring lesion, chemotherapy has been used as a treatment. Ocular JXG is usually unilateral and presents with a tumor, a red eye with signs of uveitis, unilateral glaucoma, spontaneous hyphema or heterochromia iridis. Diagnosing and treating the patient as early as possible contributes to the most positive visual outcome.

Histiocytic disorders like JXG are identified by the cells that make them up. Immunohistochemical analysis is used to discern the immunoreactivity to certain antibodies in these analyses. JXG is a non-LHC disorder which is a varied group of disorders defined by the accumulation of histiocytes that do not meet criteria to be diagnosed as Langerhans cells. JXG is not metastatic and may be present with lipid deposits. JXG is often accompanied with other disorders such as neurofibromatosis type I and juvenile chronic myelogenous leukemia. Juvenile variety xanthogranuloma can be distinguished from xanthoma by the spread of the lesion and the lack of lipid abnormalities. Other similar diagnoses include molluscum contagiosum, hemangioma and neurofibroma.

== See also ==
- Non-X histiocytoses
- List of cutaneous conditions
