= HMB-45 =

Monoclonal antibody for melanomas

HMB-45 is a monoclonal antibody that reacts against an antigen present in melanocytic tumors such as melanomas, and stands for Human Melanoma Black. It is used in anatomic pathology as a marker for such tumors. The specific antigen recognized by HMB-45 is now known as Pmel 17.

== History ==
HMB-45 was discovered by Drs. Allen M. Gown and Arthur M. Vogel in 1986. The antibody was generated to an extract of melanoma.

== Cancer diagnostics ==
In a study to determine diagnostic usefulness of specific antibodies used to identify melanoma, HMB-45 had a 92% sensitivity when used to identify melanoma. The antibody also reacts positively against junctional nevus cells and fetal melanocytes.

Despite this relatively high sensitivity—HMB-45 does have its drawbacks. HMB-45 can be detected in only 50-70% of melanomas. HMB-45 does not react well against intradermal nevi, normal adult melanocytes, spindle cell melanomas and desmoplastic melanomas. HMB-45 is nonreactive with almost all non-melanoma human malignancies, with the exception of rare tumors showing evidence of melanogenesis (e.g., pigmented schwannoma, clear cell sarcoma) or tumors associated with tuberous sclerosis complex (angiomyolipoma and lymphangiomyoma).

== Storage ==
HMB-45 should be stored at 4 degree Celsius, where the antibody will be stable for up to 2 months without any loss of quality.

== Alternatives ==
When conducting an immunocytochemical studies to identify melanoma for scientific or clinical studies, scientist and medical professionals can also use S-100, Melan-A, Tyrosinase, and Mitf to identify tumors.

== See also ==
- List of histologic stains that aid in diagnosis of cutaneous conditions
