= Giant cell =

Mass resulting from the fusion of many cells

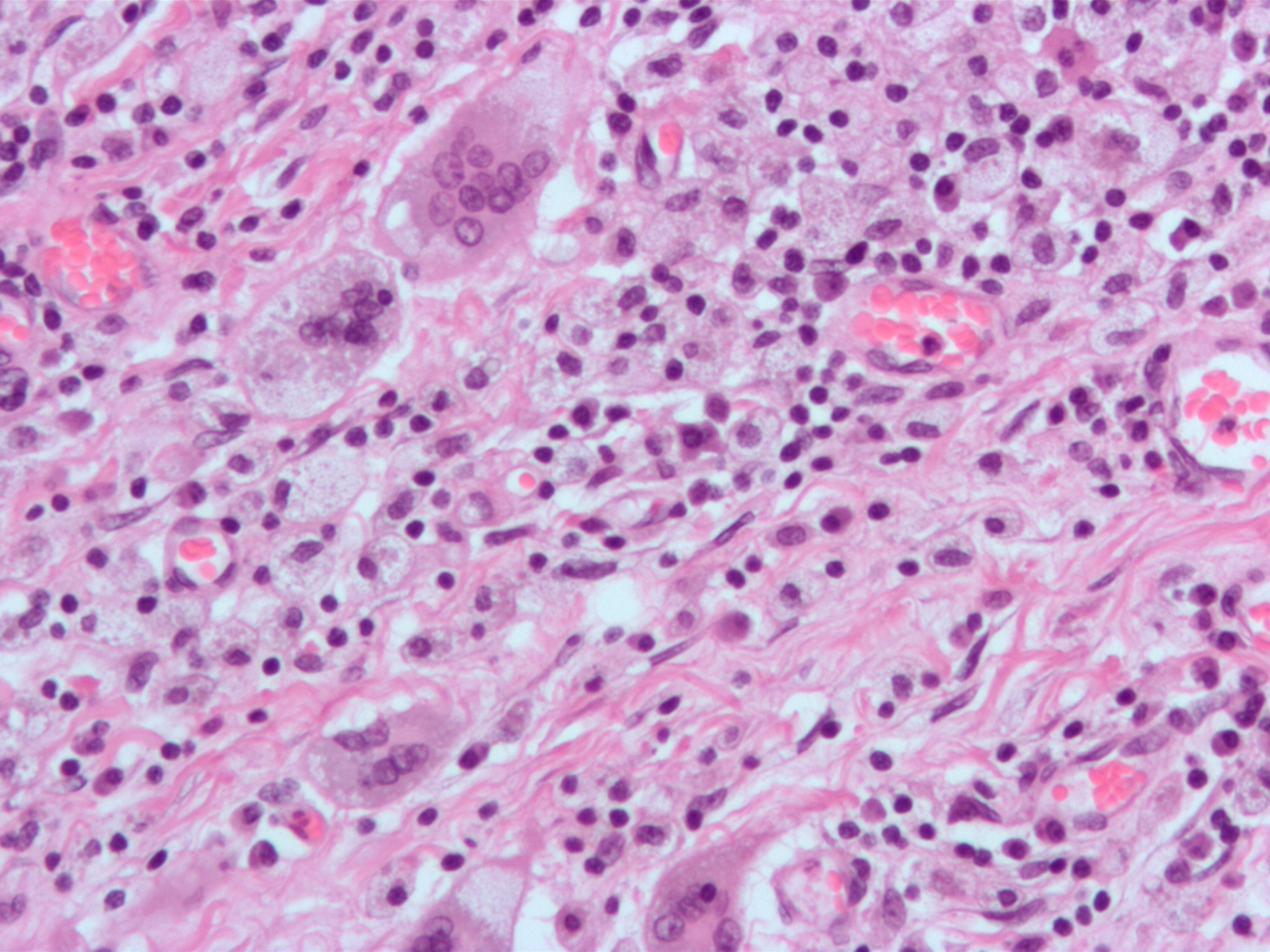
Multinucleated giant cells due to an infection. H&E stain.

A giant cell (also known as a multinucleated giant cell, or multinucleate giant cell) is a mass formed by the union of several distinct cells (usually histiocytes), often forming a granuloma.

Although there is typically a focus on the pathological aspects of multinucleate giant cells (MGCs), they also play many important physiological roles. Osteoclasts are a type of MGC that are critical for the maintenance, repair, and remodeling of bone and are present normally in a healthy human body. Osteoclasts are frequently classified and discussed separately from other MGCs which are more closely linked with disease.

Non-osteoclast MGCs can arise in response to an infection, such as tuberculosis, herpes, or HIV, or as part of a foreign body reaction. These MGCs are cells of monocyte or macrophage lineage fused together. Similar to their monocyte precursors, they can phagocytose foreign materials. However, their large size and extensive membrane ruffling make them better equipped to clear up larger particles. They utilize activated CR3s to ingest complement-opsonized targets. Non-osteoclast MGCs are also responsible for the clearance of cell debris, which is necessary for tissue remodeling after injuries.

Types include foreign-body giant cells, Langhans giant cells, Touton giant cells, Giant-cell arteritis

== History ==
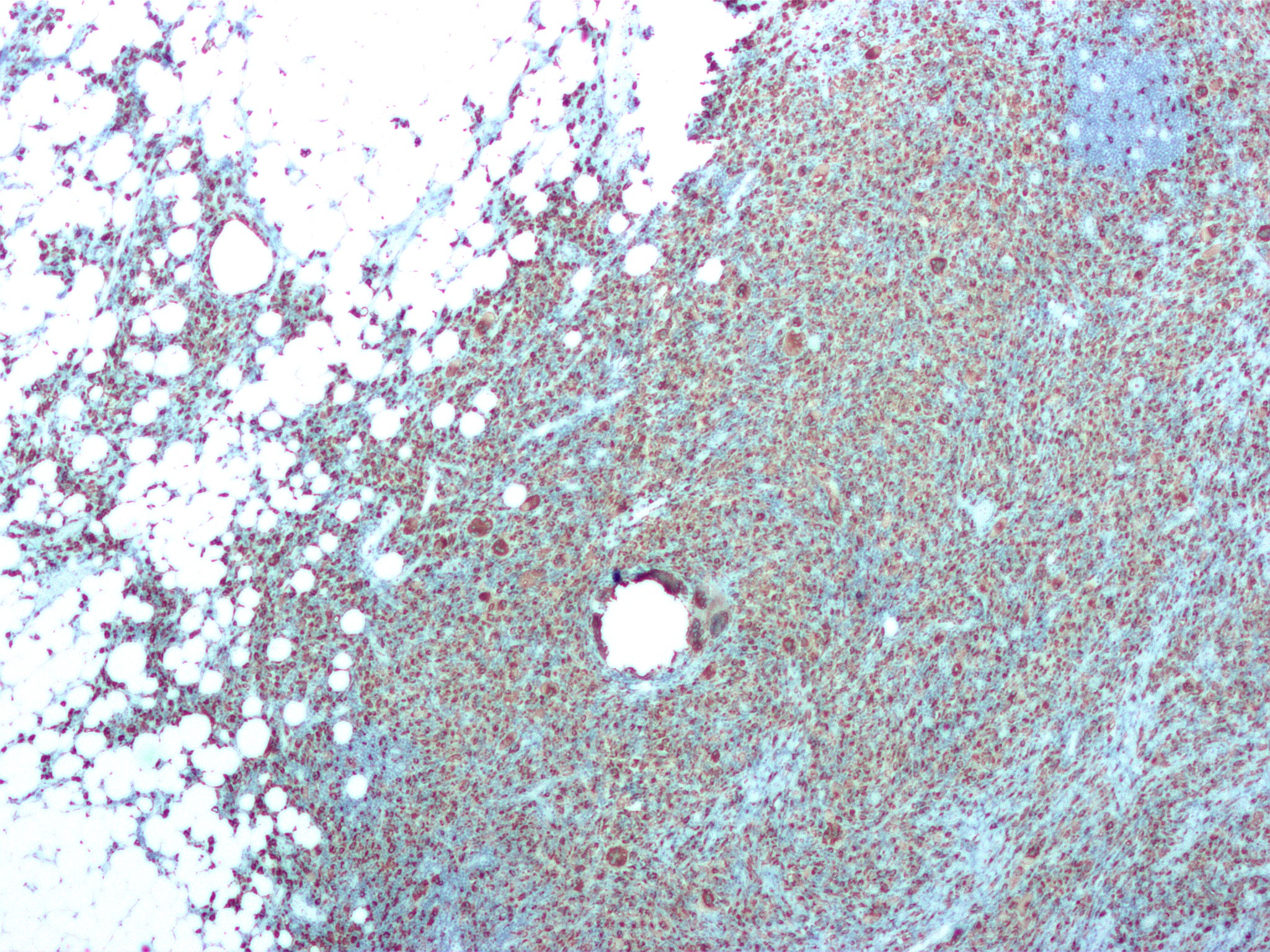
CD68 immunostaining demonstrating giant cells and macrophages

Osteoclasts were discovered in 1873. However, it was not until the development of the organ culture in the 1970s that their origin and function could be deduced. Although there was a consensus early on about the physiological function of osteoclasts, theories on their origins were heavily debated. Many believed osteoclasts and osteoblasts came from the same progenitor cell. Because of this, osteoclasts were thought to be derived from cells in connective tissue. Studies that observed that bone resorption could be restored by bone marrow and spleen transplants helped prove osteoclasts' hematopoietic origin.

Other multinucleated giant cell formations can arise from numerous types of bacteria, diseases, and cell formations. Giant cells are also known to develop when infections are present. They were first observed as early as the middle of the last century, but it is not fully understood why these reactions occur. In the process of giant cell formation, monocytes or macrophages fuse together, which could cause multiple problems for the immune system.

== Osteoclast ==
Osteoclasts are the most prominent examples of MGCs and are responsible for the resorption of bones in the body. Like other MGCs, they are formed from the fusion of monocyte/macrophage precursors. However, unlike other MGCs, the fusion pathway they originate from is well elucidated. They also do not ingest foreign materials and instead absorb bone matrix and minerals.

Osteoclasts are typically associated more with healthy physiological functions than they are with pathological states. They function alongside osteoblasts to remodel and maintain the integrity of bones in the body. They also contribute to the creation of the niche necessary for hematopoiesis and negatively regulate T cells. However, while the primary functions of osteoclasts are integral to maintaining a healthy physiological state, they have also been linked to osteoporosis and the formation of bone tumors.

== Giant cell arteritis ==
Giant cell arteritis, also known as temporal arteritis or cranial arteritis, is the most common MGC-linked disease. This type of arteritis causes the arteries in the head, neck, and arm area to swell to abnormal sizes. Although the cause of this disease is not currently known, it appears to be related to polymyalgia rheumatica.

Giant cell arteritis is most prevalent in older individuals, with the rate of disease being seen to increase from age 50. Women are 2–3 times more likely to develop the disease than men.

Northern Europeans have been observed to have a higher incidence of giant cell arteritis compared to southern European, Hispanic, and Asian populations. It has been suggested that this difference may lie in the criteria used to diagnose giant cell arteritis rather than actual disease incidence, in addition to genetic and geographic factors.

=== Symptoms ===
Symptoms may include a mild fever, loss of appetite, fatigue, vision loss, and severe headaches. These symptoms are often misinterpreted leading to a delay in treatment. If left untreated, this disease can result in permanent blindness.

=== Diagnosis ===
The current highest standard for diagnosis is a temporal artery biopsy. The skin on the patient's face is anesthetized, and an incision is made in the face around the area of the temples to obtain a sample of the temporal artery. The incision is then sutured. A histopathologist examines the sample under a microscope and issues a pathology report (pending extra tests that may be requested by the pathologist).

The management regime consists primarily of systemic corticosteroids (e.g. prednisolone), commencing at a high dose.

== Langhans giant cell ==
Langhans giant cells are named for the pathologist who discovered them, Theodor Langhans. Like many of the other kinds of giant cell formations, epithelioid macrophages fuse together and form a multinucleated giant cell. The nuclei form a circle or semicircle similar to the shape of a horseshoe away from the center of the cell. Langhans giant cell was typically associated with tuberculosis but has been found to occur in many types of granulomatous diseases.

Langhans giant cell could be closely related to tuberculosis, syphilis, sarcoidosis, and deep fungal infections. Langhans giant cell occurs frequently in delayed hypersensitivity.

=== Symptoms ===
Symptoms may include fever, weight loss, fatigue and loss of appetite.

=== Diagnosis ===
This type of giant cell could be caused by bacteria that spread from person to person through the air. Tuberculosis is related to HIV; many people who have HIV also have a hard time fighting off diseases and sicknesses. Many tests may be performed to treat other related diseases to obtain the correct diagnosis for Langhans giant cell.

== Touton giant cell ==
Also known as xanthelasmatic giant cells, Touton giant cells consist of fused epithelioid macrophages and have multiple nuclei. They are characterized by the ring-shaped arrangement of their nuclei and the presence of foamy cytoplasm surrounding the nucleus. Touton giant cells have been observed in lipid-laden lesions such as fat necrosis.

=== Demographics ===
The formation of Touton giant cell is most common in men and women aged 37–78.

=== Symptoms ===
Touton giant cells typically cause similar symptoms to other forms of giant cell, such as fever, weight loss, fatigue and loss of appetite.

== Foreign-body giant cell ==
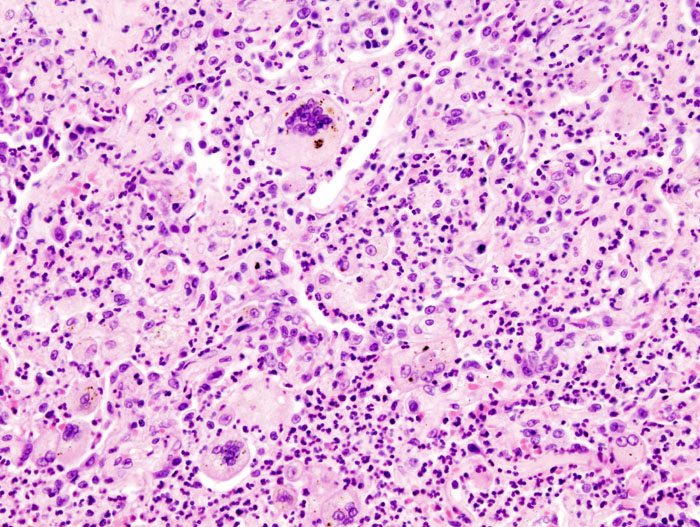
Foreign-body giant cells in the lung. H&E stain.

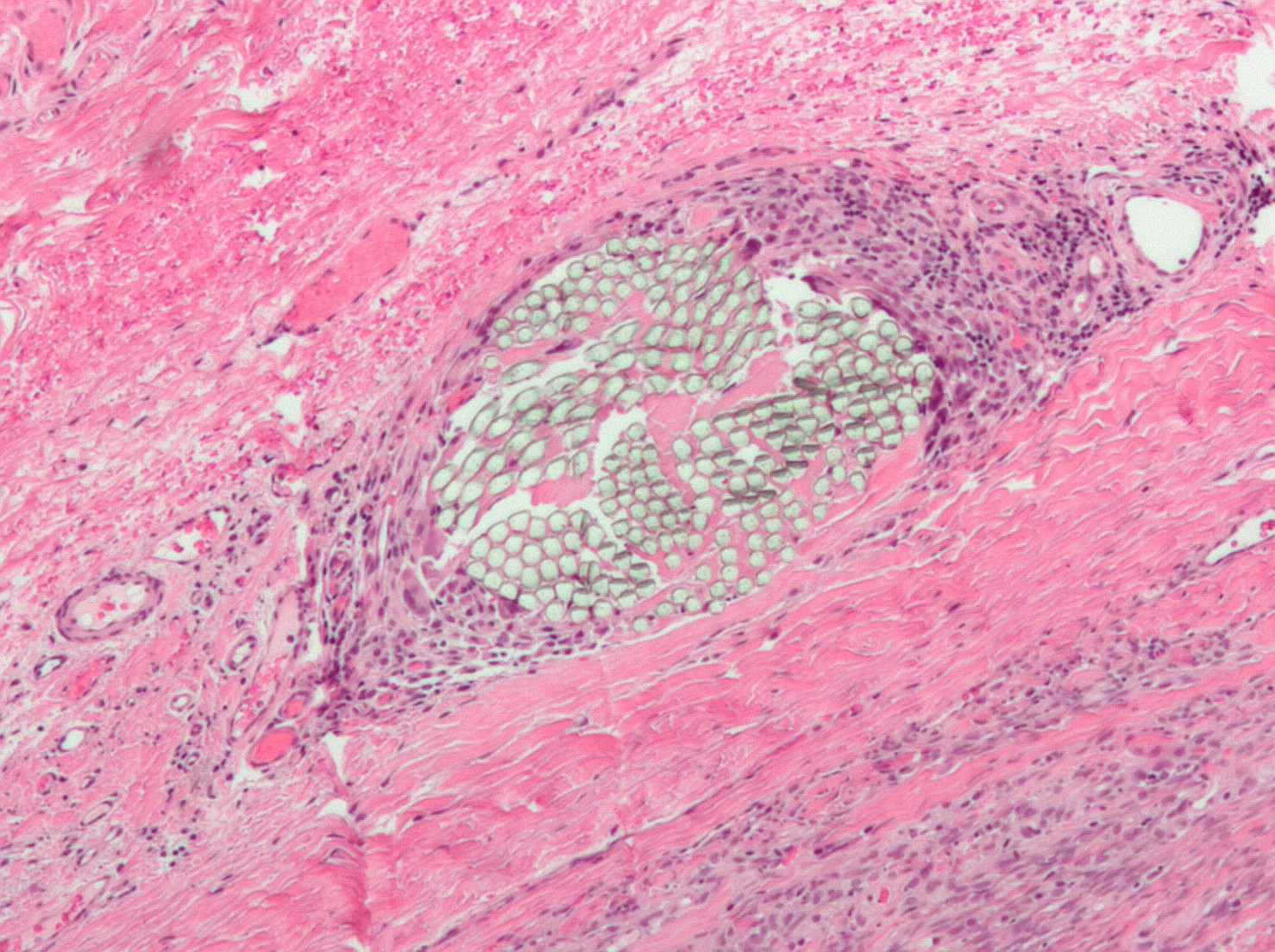
Foreign-body giant cell reaction to a suture. H&E stain.

Foreign-body giant cells form when a subject is exposed to a foreign substance. Exogenous substances can include talc or sutures. As with other types of giant cells, epithelioid macrophages fusing together causes these giant cells to form and grow. In this form of giant cell, the nuclei are arranged in an overlapping manner. This giant cell is often found in tissue because of medical devices, prostheses, and biomaterials.

== Reed-Sternberg cell ==
Reed-Sternberg cells are generally thought to originate from B-lymphocytes. They are hard to study due to their rarity, and there are other theories about the origins of these cells. Some less popular theories speculate that they may arise from the fusion between reticulum cells, lymphocytes, and virus-infected cells.

Similar to other MGCs, Reed-Sternberg cells are large and are either multinucleated or have a bilobed nucleus. Their nuclei are irregularly shaped, contain clear chromatin, and possess an eosinophilic nucleolus.

== Role in tumour formation ==
Some researchers have conjectured that Giant cells may be instrumental in the formation of tumours, and that their origin may be in the stress-induced genomic reorganization proposed by Nobel Laureate Barbara McClintock. It had previously been suggested that such genomic stress could be aggravated by some genotoxic agents used in cancer therapy.

Poly-aneuploid cancer cells (PACCs) may serve as efficient sources of heritable variation that allows cancer cells to evolve rapidly.

== Endogenous causative agents ==
Endogenous substances such as keratin, fat, and cholesterol crystals (cholesteatoma) can induce mast cell formation.

== Multinucleated giant cells in COVID-19 patients ==
Coronavirus disease 2019 (COVID-19) is caused by a novel coronavirus called SARS-CoV-2. Multinucleated giant cells have been detected in biopsy specimens from patients with COVID-19 disease. This type of giant cell was first found in pulmonary pathology of early phase 2019 novel coronavirus (COVID-19) pneumonia in two patients with lung cancer after a biopsy. Specifically, they were located in inflammatory fibrin clusters, sometimes together with mononuclear inflammatory cells. Another pathological study also detected this type of giant cell in COVID-19 and described it as a "multinucleated syncytial cell". The morphological analysis showed that multinucleated syncytial cells and atypical enlarged pneumocytes demonstrating cytomorphological changes consistent with viral infection were found in the intra-alveolar spaces. The viral antigen was detected in the cytoplasm of multinucleated syncytial cells, indicating the presence of the SARS-CoV-2 virus. However, a later post-mortem study has described these cells as 'giant cell-like' rather than true giant cells derived from histiocytes. Instead, they are derived from type II pneumocyte clusters with cytopathic changes, which was confirmed by cytokeratin staining. The infection and pathogenesis of the SARS-CoV-2 virus in the human patient largely remained unknown.

Multinucleate giant cells have also been described in MERS-CoV, a closely related coronavirus.

A further study to characterize the role of multinucleated giant cells in human immune defense against COVID-19 may lead to more effective therapies.

== See also ==
- Idiopathic giant cell myocarditis
- Large cell
- Reed–Sternberg cell
- Subependymal giant cell astrocytoma
- Syncitium
