= Rosai–Dorfman disease =

Rosai-Dorfman disease
- Other names: Destombes-Rosaï-Dorfman disease
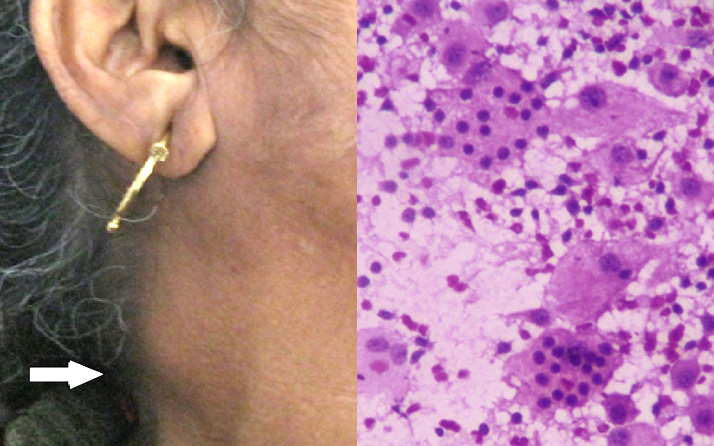
- Patient with enlarged lymph node on neck caused by Rosai-Dorfman disease; H&E stain of fine-needle aspiration specimens showed histiocytes with intact lymphocytes and plasma cells inside them (i.e., emperipolesis).
- Specialty: Hematology

Rosai–Dorfman disease, also known as sinus histiocytosis with massive lymphadenopathy or sometimes as Destombes–Rosai–Dorfman disease, is a rare disorder of unknown cause that is characterized by abundant histiocytes in lymph nodes or other locations including the skin, sinuses, brain and heart. Individuals with the disorder often present with enlarged lymph nodes and a nodular red skin rash. The main causes of morbidity with the illness are systemic infection from impaired immune response and organ dysfunction from histiocyte deposition throughout the body.

== Signs and symptoms ==
The histiocytosis of Rosai–Dorfman disease can occur in lymph nodes, causing lymphadenopathy, or can occur outside lymph nodes in extranodal disease.

=== Lymphadenopathy ===
Lymphadenopathy can occur in one or more groups of lymph nodes. Among 358 cases of Rosai–Dorfman disease that Rosai collected in a disease registry for which the location of lymphadenopathy was specified, 87.3% had cervical lymphadenopathy. Axillary, inguinal, and mediastinal lymphadenopathy are also found in Rosai–Dorfman disease.

=== Extranodal disease ===
Accumulation of histiocytes may occur outside of lymph nodes. The most common sites of extranodal disease in Rosai's registry were skin, nasal cavity/paranasal sinuses, soft tissue, eyelid/orbit, bone, salivary glands, central nervous system, and heart.

The symptoms of this disease vary with the site of accumulation similar to other regional tumors. For instance, accumulation in closed spaces such as the cranium can lead to poor outcomes compared to growth in the dermis of an extremity where surgical excision is possible.

== Cause ==
The etiology of the condition is unknown. Possible but unproven infectious causes are Klebsiella, polyomaviridae, Epstein–Barr virus, parvovirus B19, and human herpesvirus 6. Jilin University researchers suggested in 2017 that monocytes recruited to inflammatory lesions could produce macrophage colony-stimulating factor, which leads to a complex signal transduction, which leads to the histiocytosis characteristic of Destombes-Rosai–Dorfman disease.

== Diagnosis ==
The differential diagnosis of Destombes–Rosai–Dorfman disease includes both malignant and nonmalignant diseases, such as granulomatosis with polyangiitis, Langerhans cell histiocytosis, Langerhans cell sarcoma, lymphoma, sarcoidosis, IgG4-related disease, and tuberculosis. The disease is diagnosed by biopsy of affected tissues. Microscopic examination of stained specimens will show histiocytes with lymphocytes and possibly other types of cells trapped within them, a phenomenon known as emperipolesis. Upon immunohistochemical staining, the histiocytes will be positive for S100, CD68, and CD163 but negative for CD1a.

=== Classification ===
In 2016 the Histiocyte Society proposed a classification of histiocytoses into five groups designated by letters: "C", "H", "L", "M", and "R". Group "R" included Rosai–Dorfman disease and "miscellaneous noncutaneous, non-Langerhans cell histiocytoses". Rosai–Dorfman disease itself was classified into "Familial", "Classical (nodal)", "Extranodal", "Neoplasia-associated", and "Immune disease-associated" subtypes.

== Treatment ==
Some patients have no symptoms, spontaneous remission, or a relapsing/remitting course, making it difficult to decide whether therapy is needed. In 2002, authors from Sapienza University of Rome stated on the basis of a comprehensive literature review that "clinical observation without treatment is advisable when possible".

Therapeutic options include surgery, radiation therapy, and chemotherapy. Surgery is used to remove single lymph nodes, central nervous system lesions, or localized cutaneous disease. In 2014, Dalia and colleagues wrote that for patients with extensive or systemic Destombes–Rosai–Dorfman disease, "a standard of care has not been established" concerning radiotherapy and chemotherapy.

== History ==
In 1965, Pierre-Paul Louis Lucien Destombes described, in French, four patients having "adenitis with lipid excess," which is recognized as the original description of the condition. Therefore, the condition is sometimes called Destombes–Rosai–Dorfman disease.

Four years later, in 1969, the pathologists Juan Rosai and Ronald Dorfman published a paper on "sinus histiocytosis with massive lymphadenopathy". With the discoveries that the condition can occur outside the head/neck region and in tissues other than lymph nodes, the condition later became known as Rosai–Dorfman disease.

== See also ==
- List of cutaneous conditions
