= Erdheim–Chester disease =

- Other names: Erdheim–Chester syndrome or Polyostotic sclerosing histiocytosis
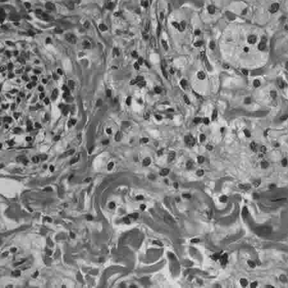
- Histopathology slide of Erdheim-Chester disease
- Specialty: Hematology-oncology
- Symptoms: Long bone pain, muscle pain, joint pain, diabetes insipidus, exophthalmos, abdominal pain
- Usual onset: Adults aged 40–60
- Differential diagnosis: Langerhans' cell histiocytosis, Rosai-Dorfman disease, Takayasu arteritis, granulomatosis with polyangiitis, chronic recurrent multifocal osteomyelitis, neurosarcoidosis
- Prognosis: Asymptomatic to multisystemic, life-threatening forms
- Frequency: Unknown. Approximately 1,500 cases (<20 pediatric) have ever been reported

Erdheim–Chester disease (ECD) is an extremely rare disease classified as a non-Langerhans-cell histiocytic neoplasm. In 2016, the World Health Organization (WHO) defined ECD as a slow-growing blood cancer that may originate in the bone marrow or precursor cells. Typical onset occurs in middle aged individuals, although pediatric cases have been documented. The exact cause of ECD remains unknown, though it is believed to be linked to an exaggerated TH1 immune response. The disease involves an infiltration of lipid-laden macrophages, multi-nucleated giant cells, an inflammatory infiltrate of lymphocytes and histiocytes in the bone marrow, and a generalized sclerosis of the long bones.

== Signs and symptoms ==
Erdheim-Chester disease can range from having no symptoms to being fatal, depending on how severe the disease is. It can cause symptoms like bone pain, heart problems, neurological issues, exophthalmos, and constitutional changes in health.

Bone pain is the most common symptom, usually affecting the long bones. The pain is typically mild but constant, occurring close to the joints. Most people with ECD have involvement of the long bones similarly on both sides of the body. More than half of cases also involve other organs, such as the heart, eyes, pituitary gland, brain, and kidneys.

The cardiovascular system is the second most affected organ, involved in more than half of reported cases. While periarterial infiltration caused by ECD usually has minimal impact, it can cause increased blood pressure if it affects the renal arteries, which is often treated with subsequent stenting. Other complications include pericardial infiltration causing tamponade, right-sided myocardial infiltration, valve issues requiring replacement, and peri-coronary infiltration, which can lead to fatal heart attacks.

Orbital involvement is also common in ECD, with approximately 25% of patients developing bilateral and symmetrical exophthalmos as the disease progresses. The mass effect from retro-orbital lesions can lead to thickening and twisting of the optic nerves. The lesions may also affect the lacrimal glands, orbital muscles, and retro-orbital fat. Additionally, yellowish periorbital cutaneous xanthomas may develop.

Central diabetes insipidus is the most prevalent central nervous system manifestation in ECD. This results from hypothalamic or pituitary infiltration and can also lead to other hormonal disruptions, such as hyperprolactinemia or gonadotropin deficiency.

Renal involvement is seen in approximately 11% of ECD cases, often presenting as obstructive uropathy due to retroperitoneal fibrosis or renal histiocytic infiltration. Symptoms can include abdominal pain, trouble urinating, and kidney problems like swelling or reduced kidney function, which may require dialysis.

== Diagnosis ==
Diagnosis can often be challenging due to several factors, including unclear biopsy findings, the rarity of ECD cases, and the need to distinguish it from Langerhans cell histiocytosis. For these reasons, ECD is often diagnosed based on a combination of clinical symptoms, histology, imaging features, and the presence of mutations in the MAPK/ERK and PI3K/AKT pathways.

Bone biopsy is said to offer the greatest likelihood of reaching a diagnosis. It would appear that approximately half these patients harbor point mutations of the BRAF gene at codon 600 substituting the amino acid glutamine for valine.

A diagnosis from neurological imaging may not be definitive. The presence of symmetrical cerebellar and pontine signal changes on T2-weighted images seem to be typical of ECD, however, multiple sclerosis and metabolic diseases must also be considered in the differential diagnosis. Video-assisted thoracoscopic surgery may be used for diagnostic confirmation and also for therapeutic relief of recurrent pericardial fluid drainage.

=== Histology ===
A definitive diagnosis of ECD is made when CD68-positive, CD1a-negative histiocytes are identified in a biopsy specimen. ECD is marked by the buildup of foamy histiocytes and occasional Touton giant cells in a fibrous tissue background. Tissue samples show xanthomatous or xanthogranulomatous infiltration by lipid-laden histiocytes. Lymphoplasmacytic infiltrates may be present but are usually sparse. The histiocytes in ECD typically show similar markers to reactive histiocytes, except when the BRAF V600E mutation is found. Classic signs, like foamy histiocytes, may not always be visible and could instead show general inflammation and fibrosis.

Immunohistochemical staining (IHC) can assist in diagnosing and classifying ECD versus other histiocytic neoplasms such as LCH. Using BRAF V600E-specific antibodies in IHC testing provides high accuracy for diagnosing the former. Unlike LCH, ECD does not stain positive for S-100 proteins or Group 1 CD1a glycoproteins, and electron microscopy of cell cytoplasm does not disclose Birbeck granules. More sensitive methods like pyrosequencing or digital droplet polymerase chain reaction may be helpful if aforementioned methods return with inconclusive results.

== Treatment ==
There are two FDA-approved targeted drugs to treat ECD.

- Vemurafenib, an oral agent approved in 2019, targets the BRAF protein. It was approved after showing dramatic efficacy in ECD patients harboring the BRAF V600E mutation.
- Cobimetinib, an oral inhibitor of MEK1 and MEK2, was approved in November 2022.

Other treatment options include:

- Interferon-α
- High-dose corticosteroid therapy
- Chemotherapy
- Pexidartinib, a drug that targets a mutation in the CSF1R pathway and has shown sustained, complete response in limited use.
- Radiation therapy
- Surgical debulking
- Ciclosporin

As there is no definitive cure, treatment should also focus on extending life and enhancing quality of life. Psychological support is important, as effective physical treatment often leads to a chronic condition, which may involve various challenges, deficits, and secondary complications.

== Prognosis ==
Erdheim–Chester disease was previously associated with high mortality rates. However, long-term survival is now more promising. Recent studies have reported that some patients receiving targeted therapies showed no disease progression. Targeted therapies using BRAF, MEK and/or other inhibitors have been dramatically efficacious. In 2019, the Mayo Clinic released guidelines for diagnosing and treating the disease, emphasizing the importance of genetic testing. Recent research findings on the disease's genomic structure, especially mutations in the mitogen-activated protein kinase/extracellular signal-regulated kinase pathway, have enabled the use of targeted therapies for most patients.

== Epidemiology ==
Approximately 1500 cases had been reported in the literature as of 2020. ECD affects predominantly adults, with a mean age of 53 years. Cases in children are very rare, with fewer than 20 reported as of 2022. No variations in clinical presentation, imaging, histopathology, or treatment response based on gender or race have been observed.

== History ==
The first case of ECD was reported by the American pathologist William Chester in 1930, during his visit to the Austrian pathologist Jakob Erdheim in Vienna.

ECD was previously considered an inflammatory condition. However, current literature supports its clonal origin, which emerged with the discovery of recurrent activating mutations in the MAPK/ERK pathway in over 90% of patients. This led to its inclusion in the 2016 World Health Organization classification of hematopoietic and lymphoid tumors.

== Society and culture ==
The Erdheim–Chester Disease Global Alliance is a support and advocacy group with the goal of raising awareness of and promoting research into ECD. ECD families and patients are also supported by the Histiocytosis Association, Inc.

=== Media ===
In the TV show House, season 2 episode 17, "All In", the initial and final diagnosis of a 6-year-old boy who presents with bloody diarrhea and ataxia is Erdheim–Chester disease.
