= Chronic multifocal Langerhans cell histiocytosis =

- Other names: Hand–Schüller–Christian disease
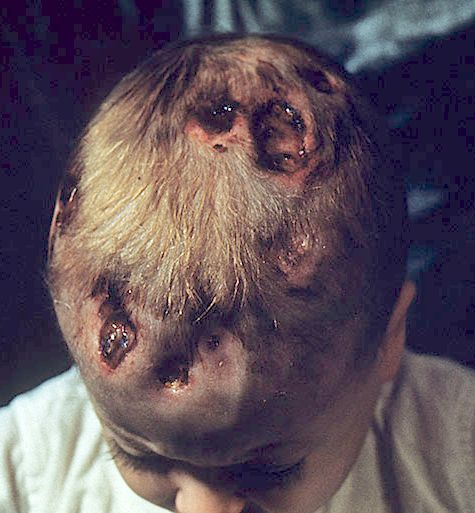
- A child with Hand-Schüller-Christian Disease
- Specialty: Dermatology
- Symptoms: Triad of bulging eyes, breakdown of bone, diabetes insipidus; Other symptoms eg. bone pain, facial asymmetry, ear infections, teeth/gum problems, liver and lung disease signs.
- Usual onset: Age 2-6
- Causes: Genetic mutation in the MAPKinase pathway
- Diagnostic method: MRI, Tissue biopsy
- Treatment: Surgery, chemotherapy, radiation therapy
- Prognosis: Variable
- Frequency: Rare

Chronic multifocal Langerhans cell histiocytosis, previously known as Hand–Schüller–Christian disease, is a type of Langerhans cell histiocytosis (LCH), which can affect multiple organs. The condition is traditionally associated with a combination of three features; bulging eyes, breakdown of bone (lytic bone lesions often in the skull), and diabetes insipidus (excessive thirst and passing urine), although around 75% of cases do not have all three features. Other features may include a fever and weight loss, and depending on the organs involved there may be rashes, asymmetry of the face, ear infections, signs in the mouth and the appearance of advanced gum disease. Features relating to lung and liver disease may occur.

It is due to a genetic mutation in the MAPKinase pathway that occurs during early development. The diagnosis may be suspected based on symptoms and MRI and confirmed by tissue biopsy. Blood tests may show anaemia, and less commonly a low white blood cell count and low platelet count.

Treatment may involve surgery, chemotherapy, radiation therapy, and certain medicines.

Hand–Schüller–Christian disease was named for the American pediatrician Alfred Hand Jr., the Austrian neuroradiologist Arthur Schüller, and the American internist Henry Asbury Christian, who described it in 1893, 1915 and 1919, respectively. Before the Histiocyte Society classified histiocytoses in the 1980s, the condition was also known as "Histiocytosis X", where "X" denoted the then unknown cause. It is now known as chronic multifocal Langerhans cell histiocytosis, a subtype of LCH.

The disease is rare. Most present between the ages of two and six. The outlook depends on how many and how much organs are affected. In some people the condition is life-threatening.

== Signs and symptoms ==
The traditional combination of three features are seen in 25% of people with the condition, which usually presents between the ages of two and six; one or both bulging eyes, breakdown of bone (lytic bone lesions often in the skull in a 'punched out' pattern), and diabetes insipidus (excessive thirst and passing urine). The skin can be affected with rashes, bumps and ulcers, and bones can be painful. There may be large lymph nodes and signs of lung and liver disease. Affected people may present with fever and weight loss.

The face may look asymmetrical and ear infections are common. Between 5 and 75% of cases have been reported to present with signs in the mouth. These include mouth ulcers, bad breath, swollen gums, loose teeth and an unpleasant taste. Destruction of part of the jaw bone may give the appearance of advanced gum disease.

== Cause ==
The cause is a genetic mutation in the MAPKinase pathway that occurs during early development. The origin is a dendritic cell, although previously thought to be a histiocyte, a term still used. The mutations causes white blood cells (lymphocytes, macrophages, and eosinophils) to move towards dendritic cells, resulting in damage in any organ except the heart and kidneys.

The disease was once thought to be a lipid storage disease as the lesions have a high cholesterol content, but the blood cholesterol is usually normal. Some sources such as the National Cancer Institute describe it as a type of cancer, while other sources specifically state it is not a type of cancer.

== Diagnosis ==
Tests usually include imaging using MRI. Findings include breakdown of bone and thickening of the pituitary stalk. The perivascular space may appear prominent, the pituitary gland cystic and there may be signs in the white matter, a mass in the hypothalamus and enhancement of the meninges.

X-ray findings typically demonstrate sharp "punched out" lesions in the skull. The destruction of alveolar bone is usually more generalised and may appear as displaced teeth.

Blood tests may show anaemia, and less commonly a low white blood cell count and low platelet count. Other useful tests might include a PET scan. Diagnosis is confirmed by tissue biopsy.

== Treatment ==
Treatment may involve surgery, chemotherapy, radiation therapy, and certain medicines.

== Prognosis ==
The outlook depends on how many and how much organs are affected. The prognosis is poor if the disease presents in a young person with many affected organs, unless a newborn with skin lesions only, when the outlook is better. The prognosis is poor if liver, spleen, lung, or bone marrow is affected. A good response to chemotherapy within the first six weeks of treatment, has been found to indicate a better prognosis. In some people the condition is life-threatening. Hence, follow-up is long-term.

== Epidemiology ==
The disease is rare. 70% of cases present before the age of 15. Around 75% of cases do not have all three traditional features.

== History ==
MRI and CT scan findings in a mummy have revealed evidence of the disease dating back to 900–790. B.C.

The historic name of Hand–Schüller–Christian disease was named for the American pediatrician Alfred Hand Jr., the Austrian neuroradiologist Arthur Schüller, and the American pathologist Henry Asbury Christian, who described it in 1893, 1915 and 1919, respectively. Shortly afterwards, Letterer in 1924 and Siwe in 1933 described a fatal condition in children who presented with large livers and spleens, large lymph nodes and bone damage. In 1940, Louis Litchtenstein and Henry L. Jaffe described a self-limiting disease characterised by "isolated bone lesions". A common feature of all these conditions was revealed to be the histological findings of large numbers of histiocytes in the tissue biopsies, leading Litchtenstein to propose that the three described conditions were part of a spectrum of a disease he named "Histiocytosis X", where "X" denoted the unknown cause. In 1973, Christian Nezelof recognised the abnormal cell as a 'Langerhans-like' cell, however it took another ten years for the disease to be accepted as one entity and the term 'Langerhans cell histiocytosis' to be internationally recognised. In 1987, the Histiocyte Society published their classification of the histiocyte disorders together with criteria for diagnosis and clinical assessment of Langerhans cell histiocytosis. Hand–Schüller–Christian disease is now considered a subtype of LCH, chronic multifocal Langerhans cell histiocytosis.

== See also ==
- List of cutaneous conditions
- Letterer–Siwe disease
