= Canine histiocytic diseases =

Category of disease affecting dogs

Histiocytic diseases in dogs are a group of diseases in dogs which may involve the skin, and which can be difficult to differentiate from granulomatous, reactive inflammatory or lymphoproliferative diseases. The clinical presentation and behaviour as well as response to therapy vary greatly among the syndromes.

There are at least four well-defined canine histiocytic diseases:

1. Canine cutaneous histiocytoma (derived from specialised epidermic dendritic cells, the Langerhans cells)
2. Reactive histiocytosis (immunohistochemical features show that interstitial/dermal DCs are involved)
2.a. Cutaneous histiocytosis (CH)
2.b. Systemic histiocytosis (SH)
3. Histiocytic sarcoma complex (immunohistochemical features of dendritic cells, possibly interdigitating or perivascular DCs)
3.a. Malignant histiocytosis
3.b. Histiocytic sarcoma

- Localized histiocytic sarcoma
- Diffuse histiocytic sarcoma

== Cutaneous histiocytoma ==
=== Histiocytoma ===
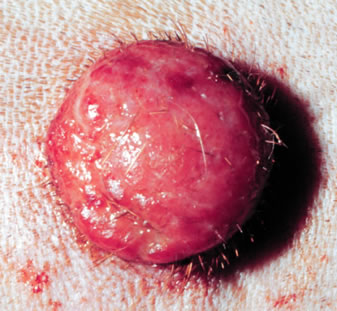
Canine histiocytoma

Histiocytoma is a common, benign, cutaneous neoplasm in dogs. Histiocytomas usually occur as solitary lesions, which spontaneously regress, and seldom recur. They can occur in dogs of all ages, but are more likely in dogs under three years of age. Epidermal invasion by cells of histiocytoma frequently occurs and intra-epidermal nests of histiocytes resemble Pautrier's aggregates, characteristically found in epidermotropic lymphoma (Mycosis Fungoides or MF). Epidermal invasion in histiocytoma, or presence of simultaneous multiple histiocytomas, especially in aged dogs, can appear similar to MF or non-epidermotropic cutaneous lymphoma (NECL). Multiple histiocytomas may look like cutaneous histiocytosis, although morphologically histiocytomas are consistently epidermotropic and commonly epidermally invasive, these are not features of cutaneous histiocytosis. Delayed regression of multiple histiocytomas can occur and lesions can persist for up to 10 months.

=== Metastatic histiocytoma ===
Recently, several cases of histiocytoma were observed in which histiocytes had migrated to draining lymph nodes and obliterated them. Pathologists diagnosed histiocytic sarcoma in these instances and prognosis was reported as poor. In 3 instances regression of these lesions occurred spontaneously within 3–4 weeks. In other instances the metastatic lesions of histiocytoma failed to regress and dogs were euthanized. The disease course in these cases extended over several months. Spread beyond lymph nodes to lung has also been observed in some of these cases. These complications are rare.

=== Langerhans cell histiocytosis ===
The presence of multiple histiocytomas is now a well recognized syndrome. However, there is yet another presentation in which widespread cutaneous lesions histologically identical to histiocytoma are observed. Clinically, the lesions are almost confluent in affected regions. Rapid internal spread is observed and the affected animals have all been euthanized. There is one published account of such a case, and we have data on 3 dogs with what appears to be an identical syndrome.

=== Immunophenotypic studies ===
Immunohistochemistry (IHC) is best performed on frozen sections of tumor (not formalin fixed material!). Histiocytoma is readily distinguished from other histiocytic disorders and cutaneous lymphoma with the aid of IHC. Our work has clearly shown that histiocytomas have the phenotype of epidermal Langerhans cells. They express CD1a, CD1b, CD1c, MHC class II, CD11c, and E-cadherin. Amongst leukocytes, E-cadherin expression is unique to Langerhans cells. Langerhans cells utilize E-cadherin to localize in the epidermis via homotypic interaction with E-cadherin expressed by keratinocytes. Histiocytomas lack expression of CD4 and Thy-1, which are consistently expressed by histiocytes in cutaneous and systemic histiocytosis. Hence cutaneous histiocytoma is a localized epidermal Langerhans cell tumor, and the rare examples of systemic spread of histiocytoma are best characterized as Langerhans cell histiocytosis (LCH) similar to that observed in humans.

== Reactive Histiocytosis ==
Systemic Histiocytosis (SH) was originally recognized in closely related Bernese Mountain Dogs. SH is a generalized histiocytic proliferative disease with a marked tendency to involve skin, ocular and nasal mucosa, and peripheral lymph nodes. The disease predominately affects young to middle aged male dogs (2–8 years), although cases in females have been observed. SH has been observed in other breeds less commonly (e.g. Irish Wolfhounds, Basset Hounds and others). Clinical signs vary with the severity and extent of the disease and include anorexia, marked weight loss, stertorous respiration and conjunctivitis with marked chemosis. Multiple cutaneous nodules may be distributed over the entire body, but are especially prevalent in the scrotum, nasal apex, nasal planum and eyelids. Peripheral lymph nodes are often palpably enlarged. The disease course may be punctuated by remissions and relapses, which may occur spontaneously especially early in the disease course. In severe disease, lesions become persistent and do not respond to immunosuppressive doses of corticosteroids.

Cutaneous histiocytosis (CH) is a histiocytic proliferative disorder that primarily involves skin and subcutis and does not extend beyond the local draining lymph nodes. CH occurs in a number of breeds. Evidence of spread beyond the skin would invoke the diagnosis of SH, a closely related disorder. Lymphadenopathy has not been emphasized in published reports, and has only been documented in a small number of our cases. The lesions occur as multiple cutaneous and subcutaneous nodules up to 4 cm diameter. They may disappear spontaneously, or regress and appear at new sites simultaneously. Topographically lesions may be found on the face, ears, nose, neck, trunk, extremities (including foot pads), perineum and scrotum.

Treatment options in SH and CH. SH has proven to be a difficult and frustrating condition to treat. Consequently, many of the early cases were euthanized. Originally we treated dogs with Thymosin (derived from bovine thymus) because of reports of its effectiveness in human LCH cases. Some dogs appeared to respond to this, but not consistently. The original rationale for using thymosin was that SH was likely an immunoregulatory disorder and not cancer. In the majority of instances corticosteroid treatment is ineffective, although in some instances of CH (about 10% of cases), steroid administration is very effective in controlling lesions so steroids are worth trying in this disease given the expense of the alternatives. More recently we have had success with immuno-suppressive doses of Cyclosporin A or Leflunomide. These drugs are potent inhibitors of T cell activation and their ability to abrogate clinical disease gives further support for SH and CH being disorders of immune regulation. Treatment with these drugs is exorbitantly expensive and may be needed for life in dogs with continuously active disease, which usually is the case in advanced SH. It is preferable not to invoke such powerful immuno-suppressive therapy in most cases of CH in which spontaneous regression of lesions or episodic disease activation is more likely to occur.

Microscopic features of SH and CH The lesions of SH in most tissues consist of perivascular infiltrates of large histiocytes and variable populations of lymphocytes, neutrophils and eosinophils. The histiocytes frequently invade vessel walls and this may lead to vascular compromise and infarction of surrounding tissues. The widespread distribution of lesions of SH is only fully appreciated at necropsy. Histiocytic lesions have been observed in skin, lung, liver, bone marrow, spleen, peripheral and visceral lymph nodes, kidneys, testes, orbital tissues, nasal mucosa and others. In skin, the lesions of SH and CH are virtually identical — they consist of perivascular histiocytic infiltrates containing lymphocytes and other inflammatory cells in variable proportions (neutrophils, plasma cells, and occasionally eosinophils). The lesions usually involve the deep dermis and subcutis. Involvement of the superficial dermis is inconsistent and epidermotropism of the histiocytes is not observed. In CH the lesions are limited to the skin and draining lymph nodes.

== Histiocytic sarcoma complex ==
The histiocytic sarcoma (HS) complex encompasses a number of distinctive clinical entities which will be described below. Some definitions are in order, and reflect the preferred nomenclature of the writing group of the Histiocyte Society. Histiocytic neoplasia which originates at a single site is called histiocytic sarcoma. This form of histiocytic sarcoma, which is often encountered on the extremities, has the best prognosis if treated early by surgical excision or by amputation of a limb. When spread to distant sites beyond the local lymph node occurs, the disease is then termed disseminated histiocytic sarcoma; this is more likely to occur unnoticed when primary lesions occur in cryptic sites (e.g. spleen, lung, and bone marrow). This latter form of HS is most like malignant histiocytosis (MH). MH is an aggressive, histiocytic neoplasm which arises in multiple sites simultaneously. Most lesions previously defined as MH are probably more correctly termed disseminated HS. The occurrence of true MH is difficult to establish because the lesions often occur in cryptic sites, and the existence of histiocytic neoplasia is only recognized after clinical signs have appeared and disease progression is advanced. HS and MH are capable of widespread metastasis, hence in time the 2 syndromes merge clinically and it is not always possible to differentiate true multicentric origin (MH) from widespread metastasis of disseminated HS. Also, it is never possible to know exactly how long the disease process has been operative. Hence, the perception is that both disseminated HS and MH follow a rapid clinical progression despite therapeutic intervention. This is certainly true once clinical signs are apparent, but the subclinical period is of unknown duration.

The HS complex of diseases is best recognized in the Bernese Mountain Dog in which a familial association is apparent. Other breeds are predisposed to HS complex diseases and include Rottweilers, Golden Retrievers, and Flat-coated Retrievers. Although HS complex is not limited to just these breeds and can occur sporadically in any breed. Primary lesions of HS occur in spleen, lymph node, lung, bone marrow, skin and subcutis especially of extremities. Secondary sites are widespread, but consistently include liver and lung (with splenic primary), and hilar lymph node (with lung primary). Clinical signs include anorexia, weight loss, and lethargy. Other signs depend on the organs involved and are a consequence of destructive mass formation. Accordingly, pulmonary symptoms such as cough and dyspnea have been seen. CNS involvement (primary or secondary) can lead to seizures, incoordination and paralysis. Regenerative and non-regenerative anemia have been consistently documented in hemophagocytic HS. Lameness is often observed in periarticular HS.

Treatment of HS complex Localized HS affecting skin and subcutis have been cured by early surgical excision. In the case of periarticular HS which occurs in the subsynovial tissues of the extremities, amputation of the affected limb is enforced by the inoperable nature of the primary lesion which ensnares structures vital to limb function. Disseminated HS (including MH) is not readily treated surgically, since even in the splenic form, early metastasis to the liver has often occurred. Response to chemotherapy has been at best brief, and the disease progresses rapidly (weeks to months) to death or euthanasia.

Morphological Features of HS Gross appearance. Lesions of HS are typically destructive mass lesions with a uniform, smooth cut surface and are white/cream to tan in color. Lesions have a soft consistency and may contain discolored areas (typically yellow) which indicate area of necrosis, which can be extensive. Lesions can be solitary or multiple within an organ (especially spleen). Periarticular HS has a distinctive appearance: it occurs as multiple tan nodules located in the subsynovium. These lesions may encircle the affected joint. Hemophagocytic HS does not initially form mass lesions in the primary sites (spleen and bone marrow). Typically, diffuse splenomegaly is observed; the cut surface is dark red and the consistency is firm. The liver is usually bile stained (jaundice) and disruption of the lobular pattern due to metastasis is observed — marked liver involvement can occur before destructive masses are noticeable.

Immunophenotypic Studies MH and HS lesions express leukocyte surface molecules characteristic of DC (CD1, CD11c and MHC II). Diffuse expression of E cadherin, Thy-1 and CD4 has not been observed in HS or MH in skin or other sites; this together with cytomorphology assists in the distinction of MH and HS from histiocytoma and reactive histiocytosis (such as cutaneous and systemic histiocytosis). In histiocytoma, the phenotype is quite similar to that of HS except for the expression of E-cadherin which occurs in histiocytoma especially in the cellular infiltrate immediately adjacent to the epidermis. In reactive histiocytosis, infiltration and proliferation of activated interstitial (dermal) DC which consistently express CD4 and Thy-1 occurs. In hemophagocytic HS, histiocytes express CD11d instead of CD11c, and MHC II. Expression of CD1 molecules is uniformly low or occasionally moderate but with a patchy distribution. This phenotype is consistent with macrophage differentiation rather than DC differentiation in which abundant expression of CD1 and CD11c is expected. The exact sublineage of DC involved in HS has not been determined in most instances. The most likely candidates include interdigitating DC in lymphoid tissues and perivascular interstitial DC in other involved tissues. Immunophenotyping and careful morphological assessment should also avoid confusion of HS and MH with the large cell form of cutaneous T cell lymphoma, and poorly differentiated mast cell tumors.

== List of immunohistological markers for canine histiocytic diseases ==
- Cutaneous histiocytoma = Langerhans cells: CD1+, CD11c+, MHCII+, CD86+, E-cad+, Langerin+, CD14-, Thy1-
- Reactive histiocytosis = Interstitial/dermal dendritic cells: CD1+, CD11b+, CD11c+, MHCII +, CD86+, Thy1+, CD4+, CD14-, E-cad-
- Histiocytic sarcoma complex = Dendritic cells (interdigitating or perivascular?): CD1+, CD11c+, MHCII+, E-cad-, Thy1-, CD4-
- Macrophages (for example in haemophagocytic syndrome): CD11d+, CD14+, MHCII+/-, CD1-, CD86-, Thy1-, E-cad-.
