= Alfred Hand Jr. =

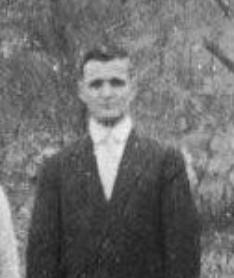
- Born: February 7, 1868; Scranton, Pennsylvania, U.S.
- Died: September 1, 1949 (aged 81)
- Education: Yale College (B.A., 1888; Ph.B., 1889); University of Pennsylvania School of Medicine (M.D., 1892)
- Occupations: Pediatrician, medical educator
- Employer(s): University of Pennsylvania; Children's Hospital of Philadelphia
- Known for: Early description of the condition later known as Hand-Schüller-Christian disease
- Parent(s): Alfred Hand; Phebe Ann Jessup Hand
- Relatives: William Jessup Hand (brother); Horace Edward Hand (brother)

Alfred Hand Jr. (February 7, 1868 - September 1, 1949) was an American pediatrician and medical educator in Philadelphia. A graduate of Yale College and the University of Pennsylvania School of Medicine, he became professor of pediatrics at the University of Pennsylvania and was associated with the Children's Hospital of Philadelphia.

Hand is remembered in medical history for an 1893 case report titled "Polyuria and tuberculosis", which later became associated with the historical disease entity known as Hand-Schüller-Christian disease. The eponym commemorates Hand, Austrian radiologist Artur Schüller, and American physician Henry Asbury Christian. The older eponym is now generally understood as part of the spectrum of Langerhans cell histiocytosis.

== Early life and education ==
Hand was born in Scranton, Pennsylvania, in 1868. He was the son of Alfred Hand, a lawyer and judge who later served briefly on the Supreme Court of Pennsylvania, and Phebe Ann Jessup Hand. His siblings included Horace Edward Hand, William Jessup Hand, Harriet Jessup Hand, Charlotte Chapman Hand, and Miles Tracy Hand.

Hand attended Yale College, where he received a B.A. in 1888 and a Ph.B. in 1889. He then studied medicine at the University of Pennsylvania School of Medicine, receiving his M.D. in 1892.

== Medical career ==
After medical school, Hand became associated with the Children's Hospital of Philadelphia. In 1893, while a resident physician at the hospital, he presented the case later connected with Hand-Schüller-Christian disease. He later served as a visiting physician to the Children's Hospital.

Hand also taught at the University of Pennsylvania. University catalogues listed him as professor of pediatrics in the School of Medicine and Graduate School of Medicine. At the time of his death in 1949, he was professor emeritus of pediatrics at Penn.

Hand was elected a fellow of the College of Physicians of Philadelphia in 1897. He was also active in the Philadelphia Pediatric Society and served as the society's secretary during the period when the society developed its milk commission.

== Hand-Schüller-Christian disease and Langerhans cell histiocytosis ==
Hand's most historically significant publication was "Polyuria and tuberculosis", published in 1893 in the Archives of Pediatrics and also reported in the Proceedings of the Pathological Society of Philadelphia. The patient was a three-year-old child with excessive thirst and urination, eye protrusion, enlargement of the liver and spleen, skin eruption, and destructive skull lesions found at autopsy. Hand originally interpreted the illness as tuberculosis.

In 1921, Hand revisited the earlier case in "Defects of Membranous Bones, Exophthalmos and Polyuria in Childhood: Is It Dyspituitarism?", published in The American Journal of the Medical Sciences. Later medical literature treated Hand's case, together with reports by Schüller and Christian, as part of the disease complex historically called Hand-Schüller-Christian disease.

The condition is no longer usually treated as a separate disease. It is now generally classified within the wider spectrum of Langerhans cell histiocytosis, a disorder involving accumulation of cells with features of Langerhans cells.

== Philadelphia Pediatric Society and milk reform ==
Hand was active in organized pediatrics during the Progressive Era. He served as secretary of the Philadelphia Pediatric Society and was one of the society members involved in the committee that led to the Philadelphia Pediatric Society Milk Commission. The commission was part of a wider urban public-health effort to improve the safety of milk supplied to infants and children in Philadelphia.

== Publications ==
Hand published case reports and clinical articles in pediatrics and related fields. His known publications include work on the condition later associated with Hand-Schüller-Christian disease, congenital heart disease, infectious disease, and rabies.

== Personal life ==
Hand lived and practiced in Philadelphia for much of his career. Yale alumni directories listed him at 1724 Pine Street in Philadelphia. He died in 1949.

== Selected works ==
- Hand, Alfred (1893). "Polyuria and tuberculosis". Archives of Pediatrics. 10: 673–675.
- Hand, Alfred Jr. (June 23, 1900). "The Pathology of Congenital Heart Disease". The Journal of the American Medical Association. XXXIV (25): 1611. doi:10.1001/jama.1900.24610250023003h.
- Hand, Alfred (1921). "Defects of membranous bones, exophthalmos and polyuria in childhood: is it dyspituitarism?". The American Journal of the Medical Sciences. 162: 509–515.
- Hand, Alfred Jr.; White, Courtland Y.; Reichel, John (March 29, 1913). "Report of a Case of Hydrophobia". The Journal of the American Medical Association. 60 (13): 990–993. doi:10.1001/jama.1913.04340130038015.

== See also ==
- Hand-Schüller-Christian disease
- Langerhans cell histiocytosis
- Children's Hospital of Philadelphia
- Perelman School of Medicine at the University of Pennsylvania
