= Eosinophilic granuloma =

Medical condition

Human eosinophilic granuloma is characterized by abnormal proliferation of Langerhans cells (LCs). LCs are antigen-presenting cells derived from dendritic cells. In humans, eosinophilic granulomas are considered to be benign tumors that occur mainly in children and adolescents. EG is a quite rare condition, and its incidence is higher in white than in black population, also slightly more affecting males than females. EG develops in 4-5 children (aged under 15) per million/year and in 1 or 2 adults per million/year.

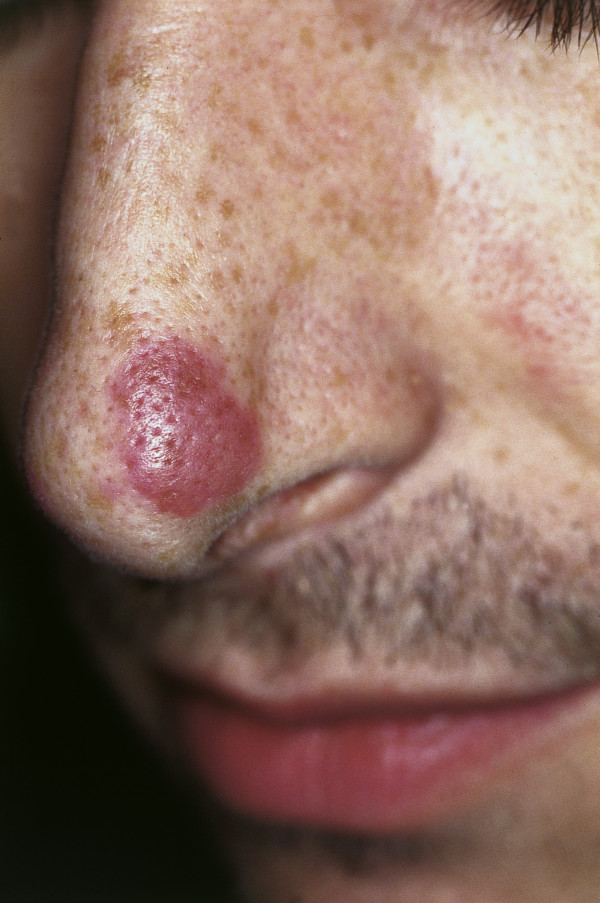
Lesion on a nose

The etiology of EG is not fully understood yet. However, the onset of abnormal LC proliferation may be triggered by viral stimuli (EBV, Human Herpes virus 6), bacterial toxins or defective regulation of IL-1 and IL-10 production. Another possible explanation may be a defect in Ras/MAPK signaling pathway due to mutation of signaling proteins. Particularly, it was published that about 50% of the EG cases had mutated BRAF V600 E gene and about 21% displayed a mutation in MAP2K1.

== Signs and symptoms ==
Clinically, single or multiple lesions are present mostly on the axial skeleton - on the skull, spine, ribs, pelvis and long bones. Specifically, thoracic spine and frontal bone within the skull are the most affected in children. On the other hand, cervical spine and jaw bone are the major spots of EG lesions in adults. Symptoms of EG include stiffness, local pain, edema of surrounding tissues, posture change, and many others, depending on the affected bone.

Lung EG is even less common. Its prevalence has not been published, however, lung EG was already diagnosed in approximately 5% of all lung biotic samples. Such condition may be asymptomatic, but also a non-productive cough, dyspnea, chest pain, fatigue, and spontaneous pneumothorax can occur. Higher risk of lung EG is being associated with smoking.

== Diagnosis ==
Diagnostic options of EG comprise X-ray, CT and MR. Histopathological examination of the bioptic sample is focused on the presence of mononuclear LCs with prominent nuclear grooves (coffee bean shaped nuclei) with addition of eosinophils. Such examination also utilizes CD1 and CD207 (Langerin) staining. Electron microscopy examination of the sample is based on detection of Birbeck granules, specific "tennis racquet" shaped inclusion within cytoplasm of LCs.

== Treatment ==
Single lesions spontaneously regress often, especially in children, thus are followed up in regular intervals. Patients with spinal lesions are immobilized to minimize the pain. More complicated cases with multiple lesions should be treated with corticosteroids, particularly with an intralesional injection of methylprednisolone. Corticosteroids also represent an option for pulmonary EG treatment. Operative treatment includes bone grafting and surgical fixation. In advanced stages of the disease, lung transplantation may be required. High-risk patients with multiple lesions (CNS-risk bones, lungs) may undergo chemotherapy.

== Cats and dogs ==
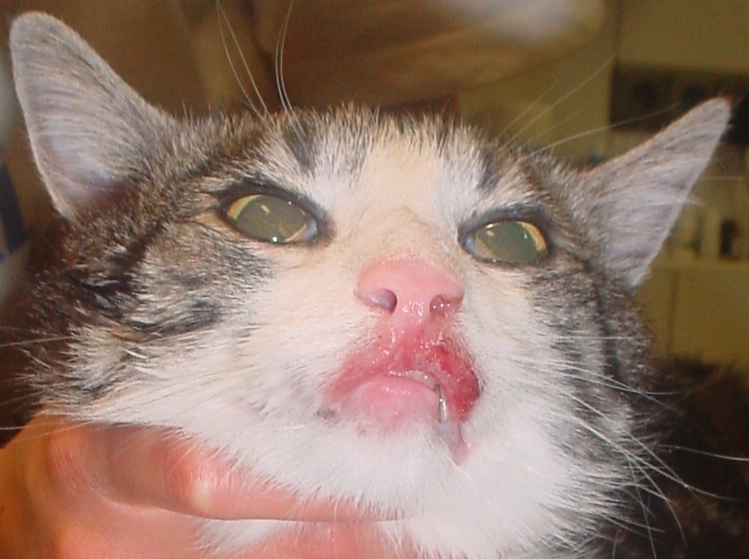
Lesion on the upper lip of a cat

=== Feline EG ===
Feline eosinophilic granuloma complex (EGC) is a relatively common condition, characterized by a number of patterns affecting oral cavity, skin and mucocutaneous junctions of cats. EGC can be triggered by various stimuli, however, the feline allergic disease is the most relevant one. Among the others, insect bites (fleas), fungi infections and viruses (Feline leukemia virus, feline immunodeficiency virus) may be responsible.

Three primary clinical lesions of EGC include indolent (also referred to as eosinophilic or rodent) ulcer, eosinophilic plaque and eosinophilic granuloma.

==== Signs and symptoms ====
The lesions mostly appear on the upper lip as ulcers, but they also develop on the gums and palate. Other locations like foot pads are not exceptional and are typical for developing plaques instead of ulcers. Such plaques may be itchy and swelling. In the case of oral ulceration, bleeding, pain and loss of appetite may be present.

==== Treatment ====
The treatment of the EGC generally consists of hypoallergenic diet combined with insect bite prevention. Corticosteroids are administered either orally or by long-acting intralesional injections. Alternatively, cyclosporine provides similar effect. Commonly used drugs include: trimethoprim/sulfadiazine, cephalexin, amoxicillin, trihydrate-clavulanate, clindamycin, methylprednisolone, dexamethasone, triamcinolone, and fluocinolone. Megestrol acetate may be used but due to side effects it's only recommended for severe and reoccurring cases.

=== Canine EG ===
Canine eosinophilic granuloma (CEG) is an extremely rare autoinflammatory state affecting primarily oral cavity and surrounding areas of transition between mucosa and hairy skin. However, there have also been described forms affecting lungs or digits. It may appear independently on the breed or age, although, particular breeds are more prone to the disease, such German shepherds, Labrador retrievers, Huskies and Cavalier King Charles spaniels. The disease also tends to appear mainly in dogs aged under 3 years.

Eosinophilic granuloma lesions in dogs primarily consists of eosinophils with addition of various cell subtypes such macrophages, neutrophils, plasmocytes, lymphocytes, mast cells and many others.

==== Signs and symptoms ====
CEG usually manifests as a plaque on the palate, gums, lips or tongue. These are proliferative white or reddish lesions that may be painful and can be the cause of halitosis and hemorrhage that are often present. Loss of appetite is the most obvious symptom indicating the illness. The lesions may spontaneously appear and wane. Biopsy is usually required for confirmation of the diagnosis.

==== Treatment ====
Although the etiology of the disease is not understood completely, it is believed that the most relevant triggers of the autoimmune reaction are various environmental stimuli, especially food allergens and insect bites. Thus, the treatment usually includes transition to hypoallergenic diet and protection from ectoparasites. Medication includes immunosuppressives (prednisone, azathioprine) either alone, or in combination with antibiotics or other drugs (cytostatics - chlorambucil). Remission of the lesions may occur in some cases, but in the others low doses of life-long immunosuppression may be necessary. Recent publications mention electrochemotherapy as a novel therapeutical method of CEG providing selective disappearance of the granuloma mass.
