= Arthur Schüller =

Austrian doctor (1874–1957)

- Born: 28 December 1874; Brno, Austria-Hungary
- Died: 31 October 1957 (aged 82); Heidelberg, Australia
- Known for: Founder of the discipline of neuroradiology; Hand–Schüller–Christian disease
- Medical career
- Institutions: Vienna University; St Vincent's Hospital, Melbourne
- Sub-specialties: Neuropsychiatry; Neuroradiology
- Notable works: Die Schädelbasis im Röntgenbilde (The Skull base on the Radiogram) (1905); Röntgendiagnostik der Erkrankungen des Kopfes (1912)

Arthur Schüller (28 December 1874 – 31 October 1957) was an Austrian medical doctor who served as professor at Vienna University and was the founder of the discipline of neuroradiology. He is credited with coining the term "Neuro-Röntgenologie" and he contributed particularly to three neurosurgical procedures; antero-cordotomy, cisternal hydrocephalic drainage and the transsphenoidal approach to pituitary tumours, and is associated with three bone diseases; the Hand–Schüller–Christian disease, osteoporosis circumscripta and cephalohaematoma deformans.

He graduated from the University of Vienna "sub auspiciis imperatoris" in 1899, and then chose to be mentored by Julius Wagner-Jauregg and Richard Kraft-Ebbing, subsequently working with Guido Holzknecht of the Röntgen Laboratory. His first notable innovation was the construction of an instrument for reaching and destroying tumours in dogs. His research made him the pre-eminent international authority on the radiology of the skull and brain, particularly after the publication of his two books; Die Schädelbasis im Röntgenbilde (The Skull base on the Radiogram) (1905), the first systematic survey of the radiology of the skull, and Röntgendiagnostik der Erkrankungen des Kopfes (1912), which became the standard neuroradiology textbook of the time. At the Vienna Medical School he made significant contributions to developing courses for international graduates.

Being of Jewish origin, he was expelled from the university in 1938 following the annexation of Austria by the Nazis. In 1939, Schüller and his wife fled to Oxford, England, and then emigrated to Australia. Their sons Franz and Hans Schüller were deported to concentration camps, where in 1943 and 1944 respectively they were killed. For the remainder of his life he worked at St Vincent's Hospital, Melbourne, Australia. He became an honorary member of the Anatomy Department of Melbourne University, and of the Neurosurgical Society of Australasia. The Austrian Society of Neuroradiology (OEGNR) awards an annual Arthur Schüller prize. Arthur Schüller Founder of Neuroradiology: a Life on Two Continents by Keith Henderson, a colleague of Schuller's at St Vincent's Hospital, was published in February 2021 by Hybrid Publishers, Melbourne.

== Early life and education ==
Arthur Schüller was born on 28 December 1874 in Brno, in Moravia, just north of Vienna. His father was an otorhinolaryngologist. After a broad education in the humanities at the German Gymnasium in Brno he entered Vienna University to study medicine at the age of 17.

In 1899 he graduated "sub auspiciis imperatoris", a status awarded very rarely by Emperor Franz Joseph, which enabled him to choose to be mentored by Julius Wagner-Jauregg and Richard Kraft-Ebbing, combining neurology and psychiatry. In 1901 he interned in Berlin with Hermann Oppenheim, Hermann Munk and Fedor Krause.

== Early career ==
On his return to Vienna he was appointed to the Second Psychiatric Clinic and to the Neurology Clinic in the Children's Hospital, where he became director in 1905. From 1902, on the advice of Wagner-Jauregg, Schuller was sent to work with Guido Holzknecht director of the Central Röntgen Laboratory at the Allgemeines Krankenhaus (General Hospital in Vienna). He had already started studying the caudate nucleus and his first notable innovation was the construction of an instrument for reaching and destroying tumours in dogs; this foreshadowed the development of human stereotactic surgery forty years later and predated by six years the work by Victor Horsley and Robert H. Clarke published in London in 1908.

By 1905 he had published Die Schädelbasis im Röntgenbilde (The Skull base on the Radiogram), the first systematic survey of the radiology of the skull, which described both normal and pathologic anatomy. In 1907, a year after becoming university lecturer, having completed his Habilitation's Thesis, he was entitled as a Privatdozent to teach and receive student fees. From 1908 he was head of the nerve department in the Franz Josef Ambulatorium in Vienna. In 1909, his advice contributed to Oskar Hirsch introducing the transphenoidal approach to pituitary tumours. Schüller's animal experiments led to his recommendation in 1910 of the anterolateral chordotomy in people with uncontrollable pain. In 1912 he published Röntgendiagnostik der Erkrankungen des Kopfes (published in America in 1918 as Roentgen Diagnosis of Diseases of the Head). It became the standard neuroradiology textbook of the time. Two years later he was awarded the title of professor extraordinarius for nervous and mental diseases of the skull and became an official university lecturer on the civil service payroll, and the youngest member of the medical faculty. He continued with his experimental work in the laboratory, which led to innovations for treating hemiplegia; sectioning of dorsal roots of spinal nerves to alleviate lightning pains which was later picked up by Spiller and Martin in the US and developed into cordotomy; stereotactic surgery for the relief of Parkinsons; cisternal puncture and drainage of the hydrocephalus.

== Interwar years ==
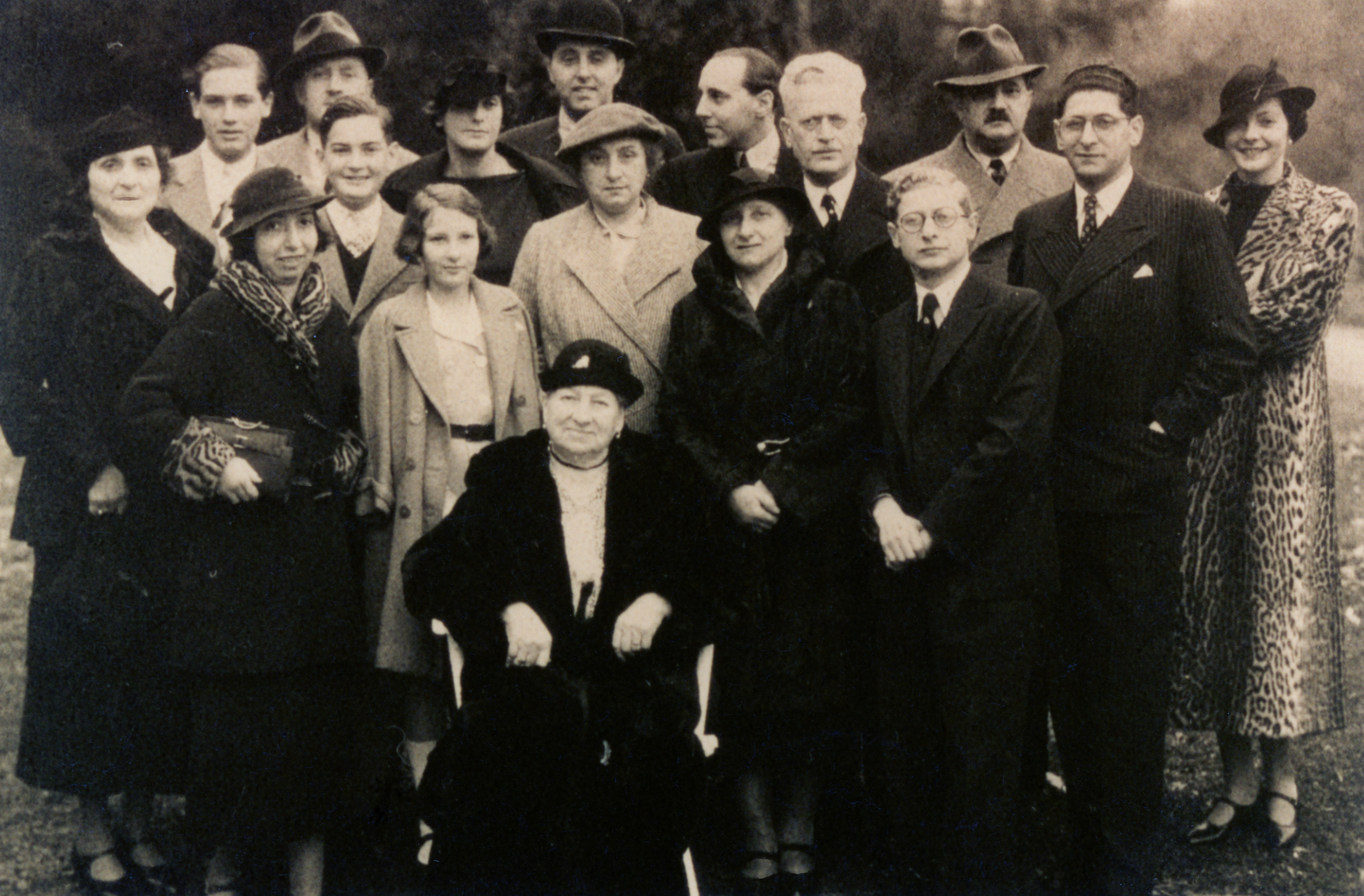
Arthur Schuller and family 1934

In the impoverished post-1918 new Republic of Austria research opportunities were restricted but Schüller retained his position as chief neurologist and continued to accept referrals pertaining to skull cases. His grasp of English and skill in teaching attracted students from other countries to attend his postgraduate courses.

He is generally credited with coining the term Neuro-Röntgenologie. His research made him the pre-eminent authority in the German speaking world on the radiology of the skull and brain, particularly after the publication of his two books. His contact with Harvey Cushing and Walter Dandy in the United States and the translation of his second book into English earned him an international reputation. In the 1930s he lectured in Europe, the UK and the US and doctors from around the world came to Vienna to learn from him. At the Vienna Medical School he made significant contributions to developing courses for international graduates. These courses prompted the establishment of the American Medical Association of Vienna to handle almost 12,000 American doctors who enrolled between 1921 and 1938. He was invited to lecture all over Europe and America.

Two weeks after he published his paper on the radiologic findings of epilepsy in children (26 February 1938), the Nazis annexed Austria. Being of Jewish origin, he was expelled from the university on 22 April 1938.

== Second World War ==
In 1939 Schüller and his wife fled to Oxford, England, to avoid further Nazi persecution. Schüller spent three months in Oxford, working with Hugh Cairns, Alfred Barclay and Wilfred Le Gros Clark. He was a prominent member of the first international conference of neuroradiologists, the July 1939 Symposium Neuroradiologicum held in Antwerp.

With his wife, in the first week of August 1939, he departed from Croydon Airport, London, and emigrated to Australia where Schüller had been invited by a former student, John O’Sullivan, to join St Vincent's Hospital in Melbourne.

== Later life ==
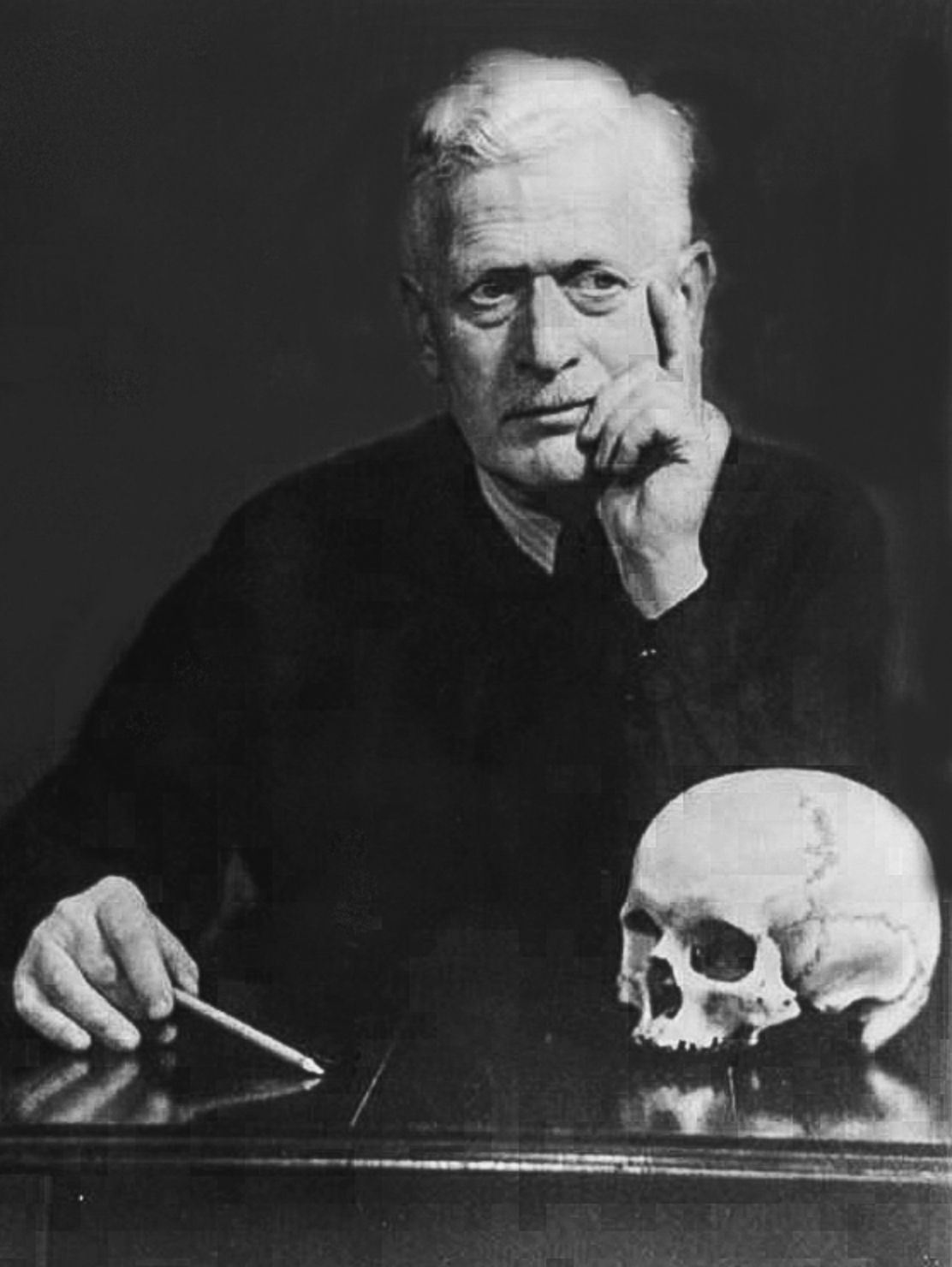
Arthur Schuller with skull

For the remainder of his life he worked at St Vincent's Hospital, with the senior neurosurgeon Frank Morgan, and O’Sullivan, who became a radiologist, inspecting all skull x-rays and attending ward rounds and operations. After initial difficulties in obtaining registration to practise he treated his own patients in private rooms and eventually also at Moreland Hospital. He became an honorary member of the Anatomy Department of Melbourne University, and of the Neurosurgical Society of Australasia. In 1949 he was elected in absentia as honorary president of the second Symposium Neuroradiologicum held in Rotterdam.

== Personal and family ==
Apart from medicine Schuller was interested in music. He played the violin in the University of Vienna Medical Orchestra and it was at the Vienna Opera that he was introduced to Margarete Stiassni whom he married in 1906. She was the sister of a prosperous textile industrialist in Brno who built the modernist Stiassni Villa. They were baptised Roman Catholic in 1908, the same year their first son, Franz Ferdinand, was born. Their second son, Hans Heinrich, was born the following year. The family home was in Vienna at 7 Garnisongasse although the sons spent much of their upbringing living with their grandmother Frederike Stiassni in Brno. They both worked for the Stiassni firm. One after the other they, their grandmother and Hans's wife and daughter were all deported to concentration camps in Theresienstadt, Auschwitz or Buchenwald. Frederike died in 1942 and the others were killed in 1943 and 1944.

== Death and legacy ==
Schüller died from Parkinsons disease on 31 October 1957 in Heidelberg, a suburb of Melbourne, Australia. Margarethe survived until 1972, and in her later years did domestic work for various families in Melbourne.

He is generally regarded as the founder of the discipline of neuroradiology. In addition to his contributions to neurosurgical procedures (transsphenoidal approach, antero-cordotomy and hydrocephalic intervention) Schüller is associated with three bone diseases: the Hand–Schüller–Christian disease, osteoporosis circumscripta and cephalohaematoma deformans.

The Austrian Society of Neuroradiology (OEGNR) awards an annual Arthur Schüller prize. Arthur Schüller Founder of Neuroradiology: a Life on Two Continents by Keith Henderson, a colleague of Schuller's at St Vincent's Hospital, was published in February 2021 by Hybrid Publishers, Melbourne.

== Selected publications ==
He had published 300 books, papers and short articles and continued to publish scientific papers until 1950.

=== Books ===
- Schüller, Arthur (1905). Die Schädelbasis im Röntgenbild (in German). Hamburg Gräfe & Sillem. OCLC 177290297.
- Schüller, Arthur; Stocking, Fred F. (1918). Roentgen Diagnosis of Diseases of the Head. Mosby.
- Schüller, Arthur; Wilder, Josef (1934). Der Kopfschmerz: Mit Einem Anhang: Röntgenologie bei Kopfschmerzen (in German). Springer. ISBN 978-3-7091-9899-5. OCLC 913699898.

=== Articles ===
- "Uber eigenartige schadeldefekte im jugendalter". Fortschr. Rontgenstrahlen. 1915.
- Schüller, Arthur (1 April 1926). "Dysostosis Hypophysaria". British Journal of Radiology. 31 (309): 156–158. doi:10.1259/bir.1926.0033 (inactive 16 July 2025). ISSN 2053-1303.
- Schüller, Arthur; Morgan, Frank (May 1946). "Cephalhematoma deformans; late developments of infantile cephalhematoma". Surgery. 19: 651–660. ISSN 0039-6060. PMID 21028540. (Co-author with F. Morgan)
- Schuller, Arthur (1943). "A Note on the Identification of Skulls by X-Ray Pictures of the Frontal Sinuses". Medical Journal of Australia. 1 (25): 554–556. doi:10.5694/j.1326-5377.1943.tb44655.x. ISSN 1326-5377.

== Bibliography ==
- Henderson, John Keith; Henderson, Michael A. (2021). Arthur Schüller: Founder of Neuroradiology: a Life on Two Continents. Melbourne: Hybrid Publishers. p. 23. ISBN 978-1-925736-60-1.
