= Paul Langerhans =

German pathologist (1847–1888)

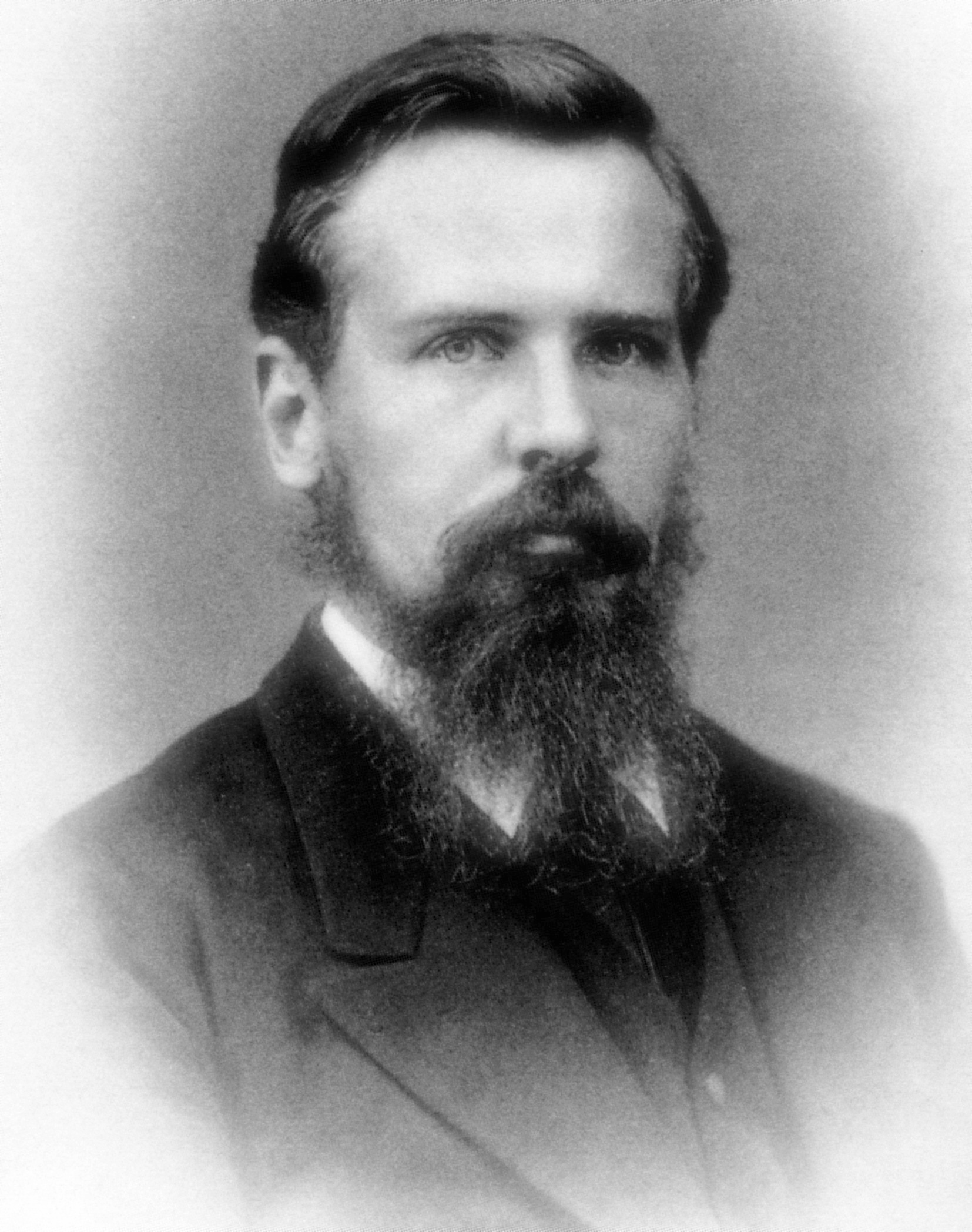
- Paul Langerhans in 1878
- Born: 25 July 1847; Berlin, Prussia
- Died: 20 July 1888 (aged 40); Funchal, Kingdom of Portugal and the Algarves
- Occupations: Pathologist, physiologist, biologist

Paul Langerhans (German pronunciation: [ˈpaʊl ˈlaŋɐhans]; 25 July 1847 – 20 July 1888) was a German pathologist, physiologist and biologist, credited with the discovery of the cells that secrete insulin, named after him as the islets of Langerhans.

== Eponymous terms ==
- Islets of Langerhans – Pancreatic cells which include insulin-producing cells. Langerhans discovered these cells during his studies for his doctorate at the Berlin Pathological Institute in 1869.
- Langerhans cells – Skin cells concerned with the immune response and which sometimes contain Langerhans granules. In 1868, Langerhans used the technique taught to him by Julius Friedrich Cohnheim to stain a sample of human skin with gold chloride and identified the cells which bear his name. From their appearance, Langerhans believed they were nerve cells. However they are a form of macrophages that were originally thought to be dendritic cells due to their morphology.
- Layer of Langerhans – In the same paper in which he described Langerhans cells, he described the granular cells in the exterior portion of the Malpighian layer of the epidermis, the stratum granulosum otherwise known as the Layer of Langerhans.
- Langerin – CD207, langerin (Cluster of Differentiation 207) is a protein which in humans is encoded by the CD207 gene. It is expressed in the Birbeck granules of Langerhans cells.

== Early education ==
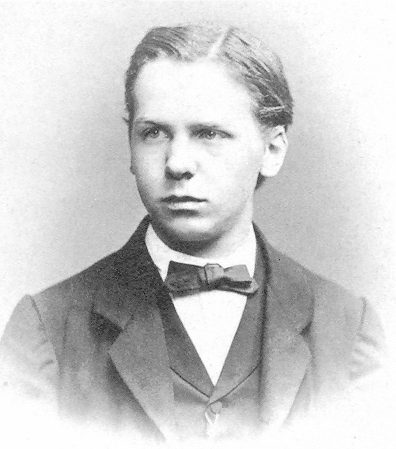
Langerhans as a student

Langerhans was born in Berlin on 25 July 1847, the son of a physician. He later entered the renowned Evangelisches Gymnasium zum Grauen Kloster in the same city. Due to his outstanding performance he was exempted from the final oral examinations. He began his medical studies at the University of Jena and completed them in Berlin.

== Major scientific contributions ==
In February 1869, he presented a thesis entitled "Contributions to the microscopic anatomy of the pancreas," in which he refers to islands of clear cells throughout the gland, staining differently than the surrounding tissue. He noticed that these areas were more richly innervated, but he could not suggest a function, except for the incorrect hypothesis that they might be lymph nodes.

One year before, still as an undergraduate, he analysed epidermal skin cells as part of an open competition organised by Berlin University. The branched skin cells resembling neuron, described in his paper entitled "On the nerves of the human skin," remained an enigma for over a century before their immunological function and significance were recognised.

== Early career and disease ==
After graduation, he accompanied the geographer Richard Kiepert to Syria, Palestine and western Jordan, but returned to Europe at the outbreak of the Franco-Prussian War and later served in an ambulance unit in France. In 1871, Rudolf Virchow arranged a position for him as prosector in pathological anatomy at the University of Freiburg, and within two years he became a full professor. It was there in 1874 that he contracted tuberculosis, very likely because of his work in the dissecting room. In search of a cure, he travelled to Naples, Palermo, the island of Capri, and underwent treatments at Davos and Silvaplana in Switzerland, but all in vain: he was forced to apply for release from his university duties.

== Consequences, Madeira and marriage ==
In October 1875 he embarked for Funchal on the island of Madeira, where he made a partial recovery and launched himself into a new career with undiminished energy. He began studying marine worms, making regular trips down to the harbour to pick over the fishermens' nets. His publications describing and classifying marine invertebrates deserve to rank as his third contribution to science. In 1887, he gave a lecture on these topics to the Royal Academy in Berlin.

He practiced as a physician in Funchal, treating mostly fellow tuberculosis sufferers, and published scientific papers about the condition in Virchow's archive. Not content with this, he also wrote a handbook for travellers to the island, and pursued studies in meteorology.

In 1885, he married Margarethe Ebart, the widow of one of his patients. They travelled to Berlin for the wedding, and he met his father, sisters and two brothers for the last time. The newly-weds rented Quinta Lambert, known as the most beautiful villa in Funchal and now the Official Residence of the President of the Regional Government. In the words of his new bride "three indescribably happy years" followed.

== Death ==
In autumn of 1887, progressive renal failure brought his medical activities to an end. He developed leg oedema, crippling headaches and transient memory loss. Sometimes he stopped in the middle of a sentence and was unable to continue. He died of uraemia on 20 July 1888, five days before his 41st birthday. He is buried in the British Cemetery of Funchal on Madeira, a place he had chosen, describing it as a "true graveyard, isolated and quiet, a good place to rest."
