= Histiocytic sarcoma =

Tumor derived from histiocytes

- Specialty: Oncology, angiology

Histiocytic sarcoma is a tumor derived from histiocytes. The tumor is often positive for CD163 and can appear in the thyroid. However, in some cases it can also appear in the brain.
