= Histiocyte Society =

Histiocyte Society logo

The Histiocyte Society is an international network of people that co-ordinate studies of the histiocytoses, which it has divided into Langerhans cell histiocytosis (class I) (previously known as Hand–Schüller–Christian disease and histocytosis-X), non-Langerhans cell histiocytoses (class II), and malignant histiocytosis (class III). They provided the criteria to definitively diagnose Langerhans cell histiocytosis.
