= Osteoporosis circumscripta =

Osteoporosis circumscripta cranii refers to a highly circumscribed (focal) lytic lesion of the skull bone as seen on X-ray in patients with Paget's disease of bones. This focal lesion can be fairly large. This finding is highly specific for Paget's disease of bones.
