= Inguinal lymphadenopathy =

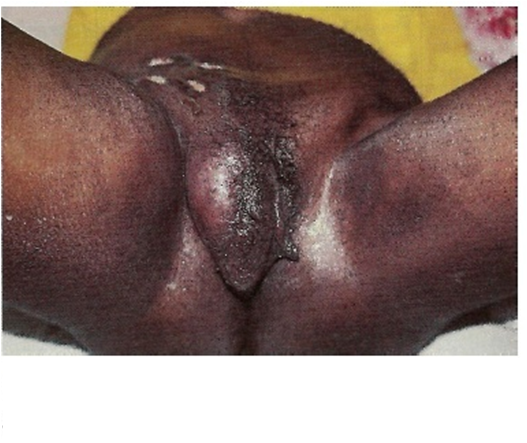
- Inguinal lymphadenopathy

Inguinal lymphadenopathy causes swollen lymph nodes in the groin area where the legs meet the torso. It can be a symptom of infective or neoplastic processes. Infective causes include Tuberculosis, HIV, non-specific or reactive lymphadenopathy to recent lower limb infection or groin infections. Another notable infectious cause is Lymphogranuloma venereum, which is a sexually transmitted infection of the lymphatic system. Neoplastic causes include lymphoma, leukaemia, and metastatic disease from primary tumours of the lower limb, external genitalia or perianal region and melanoma.

The treatment and prognosis of inguinal lymphadenopathy vary, depending on the cause.
