= Henry Asbury Christian =

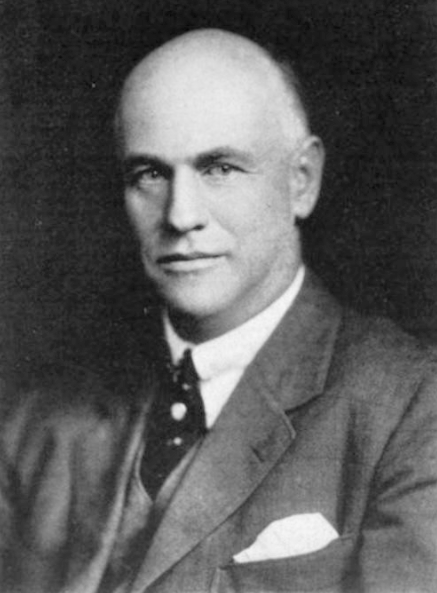
- Born: February 18, 1876; Lynchburg, Virginia
- Died: August 24, 1951 (aged 75); Whitefield, New Hampshire
- Resting place: Mount Auburn Cemetery
- Education: Randolph–Macon College; Johns Hopkins University; Harvard University
- Occupations: Physician, educator
- Spouse: Elizabeth Sears Seabury (m. 1921)

Signature
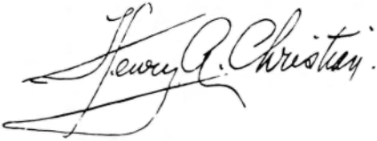

Henry Asbury Christian (February 17, 1876 – August 24, 1951), was an American professor of pathology named in the condition Hand–Schüller–Christian disease.

== Biography ==
Henry Asbury Christian was born in Lynchburg, Virginia on February 17, 1876. He earned A.B. and A.M. degrees from Randolph–Macon College in 1895, an M.D. from Johns Hopkins University in 1900, and an A.M. from Harvard in 1903.

He married Elizabeth Sears Seabury on June 30, 1921.

He died while on vacation in Whitefield, New Hampshire on August 24, 1951, and was interred in Mount Auburn Cemetery.
