= Histiocyte =

Vertebrate cell

Details
- System: Immune system

Identifiers
- Latin: macrophagocytus immobilis
- MeSH: D006644
- TH: H2.00.03.0.01009
- FMA: 84642 83585, 84642

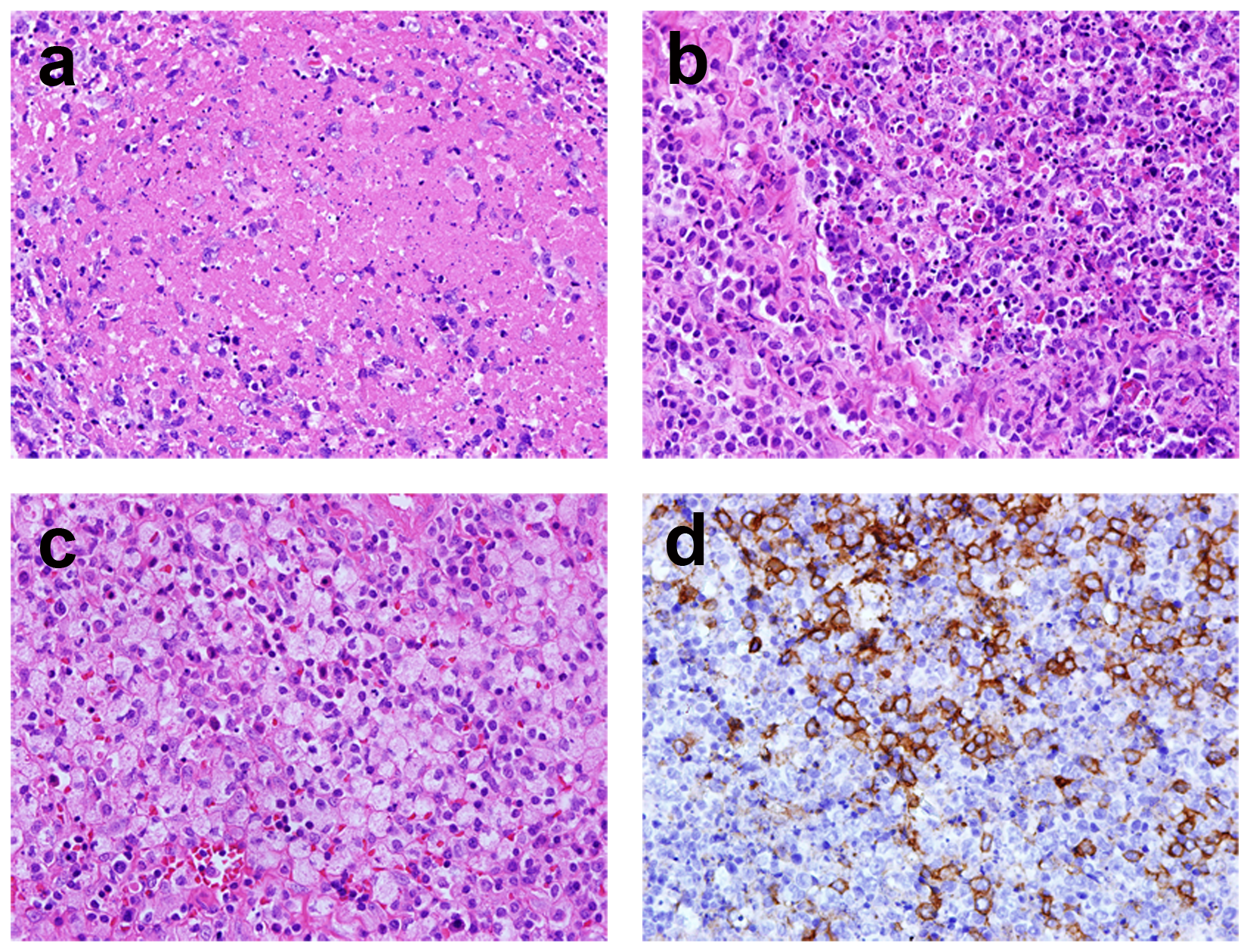
Representative photographs of an open biopsy specimen (400x): a. Necrosis, usually with blurred cell shadow, was mixed with karyorrhexis and histiocytes. b. Numerous histiocytes engulfed karyorrhectic debris. c. Foamy histiocytes were identified. d. Immunohistochemical stain for CD123 highlighted plasmacytoid dendritic cells. Hematoxylin counterstain revealed abundant karyorrhexis around the plasmacytoid dendritic cells.

A histiocyte is a vertebrate cell that is part of the mononuclear phagocyte system (also known as the reticuloendothelial system or lymphoreticular system). The mononuclear phagocytic system is part of the organism's immune system. The histiocyte is a tissue macrophage or a dendritic cell (histio, diminutive of histo, meaning tissue, and cyte, meaning cell). Part of their job is to clear out neutrophils once they have reached the end of their lifespan.

== Development ==
Histiocytes are derived from the bone marrow by multiplication from a stem cell. The derived cells migrate from the bone marrow to the blood as monocytes. They circulate through the body and enter various organs, where they undergo differentiation into histiocytes, which are part of the mononuclear phagocytic system (MPS).

However, the term histiocyte has been used for multiple purposes in the past, and some cells called "histocytes" do not appear to derive from monocytic-macrophage lines. The term Histiocyte can also simply refer to a cell from monocyte origin outside the blood system, such as in a tissue (as in rheumatoid arthritis as palisading histiocytes surrounding fibrinoid necrosis of rheumatoid nodules).

Some sources consider Langerhans cell derivatives to be histiocytes. The Langerhans cell histiocytosis embeds this interpretation into its name.

== Structure ==
Histiocytes have common histological and immunophenotypical characteristics (demonstrated by immunostains). Their cytoplasm is eosinophilic and contains variable amounts of lysosomes. They bear membrane receptors for opsonins, such as IgG and the fragment C3b of complement. They express LCAs (leucocyte common antigens) CD45, CD14, CD33, and CD4 (also expressed by T helper cells).

=== Macrophages and dendritic cells ===
These histiocytes are part of the immune system by way of two distinct functions: phagocytosis and antigen presentation. Phagocytosis is the main process of macrophages and antigen presentation the main property of dendritic cells (so called because of their star-like cytoplasmic processes).

Macrophages and dendritic cells are derived from common bone marrow precursor cells that have undergone different differentiation (as histiocytes) under the influence of various environmental (tissue location) and growth factors such as GM-CSF, TNF and IL-4. The various categories of histiocytes are distinguishable by their morphology, phenotype, and size.

- Macrophages are highly variable in size and morphology, their cytoplasm contains numerous acid phosphatase laden lysosomes – in relation to their specialised phagocytic function. They express CD68.
- Dendritic cells have an indented (bean-shaped) nucleus and cytoplasm with thin processes (dendritic). Their main activity is antigen presentation; they express Factor XIIIa, CD1c, and Class II Human leukocyte antigens.

=== Langerhans cells ===
A subset of cells differentiates into Langerhans cells; this maturation occurs in the squamous epithelium, lymph nodes, spleen, and bronchiolar epithelium. Langerhans cells are antigen-presenting cells but have undergone further differentiation. Skin Langerhans cells express CD1a, as do cortical thymocytes (cells of the cortex of the thymus gland). They also express S-100, and their cytoplasm contains tennis-racket like ultra-structural inclusions called Birbeck granules.

== Clinical significance ==
Histiocytoses describe neoplasias wherein the proliferative cell is the histiocyte. The most common histiocyte disorders are Langerhans' cell histiocytosis and haemophagocytic lymphohistiocytosis.

== See also ==
- Histiocytosis
