= Langerin =

Protein found in Homo sapiens

CD207
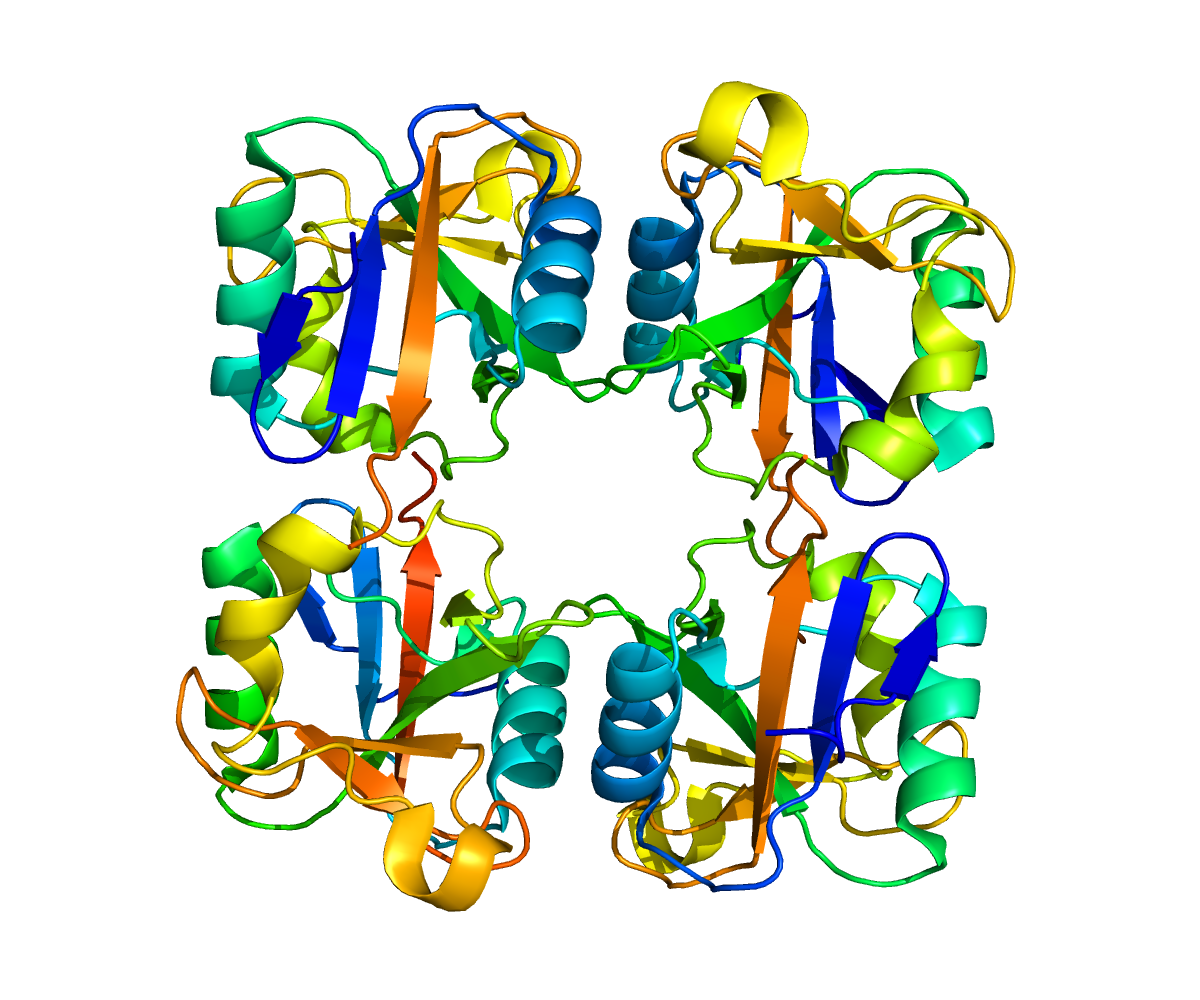

Identifiers
- Aliases: CD207, CLEC4K, CD207 molecule
- External IDs: OMIM: 604862; MGI: 2180021; GeneCards: CD207
Available structures
PDB	Ortholog search: PDBe RCSB
PDB	List of PDB id codes 3C22, 3KQG, 3P5D, 3P5E, 3P5F, 3P5G, 3P5H, 3P5I, 3P7F, 3P7G, 3P7H, 4AK8, 4N32, 4N33, 4N34, 4N35, 4N36, 4N37, 4N38

Gene location (Human)
Chr.	Chromosome 2 (human)
Band	2p13.3	Start	70,830,211 bp
Band	2p13.3	End	70,835,816 bp

Gene location (Mouse)
Chr.	Chromosome 6 (mouse)
Band	6|6 C3	Start	83,648,197 bp
Band	6|6 C3	End	83,654,839 bp
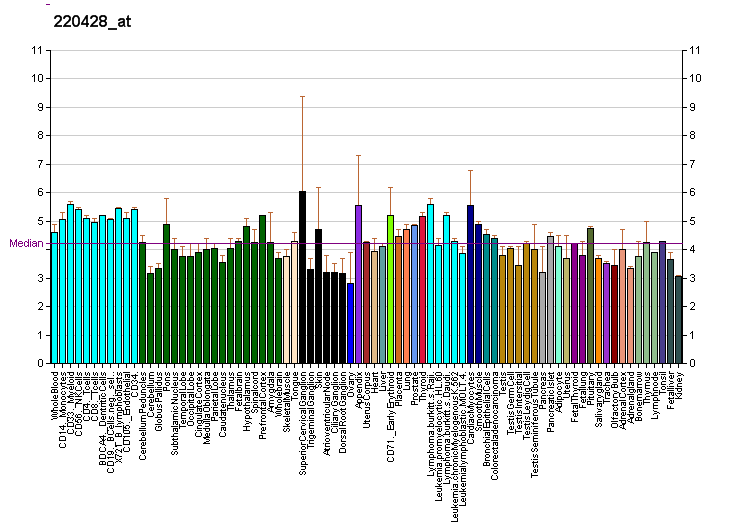
RNA expression pattern
Bgee	Human / Mouse (ortholog); Top expressed in: skin of thigh; skin of hip; skin of abdomen; skin of arm; vulva; nipple; epithelium of esophagus; oral cavity; gums; gingival epithelium / Top expressed in: skin of external ear; thymus; lip; skin of abdomen; liver; spleen; left lobe of liver; right lung lobe; skin of back; neural layer of retina; More reference expression data
BioGPS	More reference expression data
Gene ontology
Molecular function	mannose binding; carbohydrate binding; protein binding
Cellular component	integral component of membrane; clathrin-coated endocytic vesicle membrane; plasma membrane; endocytic vesicle; early endosome membrane; membrane
Biological process	antigen processing and presentation of exogenous peptide antigen via MHC class I, TAP-dependent; defense response to virus; receptor-mediated endocytosis
Sources:Amigo / QuickGO
Orthologs
Databases	NCBI: entry; OMA: entry
Species	Human	Mouse
Entrez	50489	246278
Ensembl	ENSG00000116031	ENSMUSG00000034783
UniProt	Q9UJ71	Q8VBX4
RefSeq (mRNA)	NM_015717	NM_144943
RefSeq (protein)	NP_056532	NP_659192
Location (UCSC)	Chr 2: 70.83 – 70.84 Mb	Chr 6: 83.65 – 83.65 Mb
PubMed search
- Wikidata
View/Edit Human	View/Edit Mouse

Langerin (CD207) is a type II transmembrane protein which is encoded by the CD207 gene in humans. It was discovered by scientists Sem Saeland and Jenny Valladeau as a main part of Birbeck granules. Langerin is C-type lectin receptor on Langerhans cells (LCs) and in mice also on dermal interstitial CD103+ dendritic cells (DC) and on resident CD8+ DC in lymph nodes.

== Structure ==
Langerin consists of a relatively short intracellular domain and an extracellular domain which consists of a neck-region and a carbohydrate recognition domain (CRD). The intracellular part contains a proline-rich domain (PRD). The neck region consists of alpha-helixes and mediates a formation of langerin homotrimers via a coiled-coil interaction. The homotrimers formation increases avidity and specificity of the antigen.

The CRD of langerin is similar to CRDs of other C-type lectins. It contains an EPN motif – a Glu-Pro-Asn rich region. The CRD is divided into two lobes by 2 anti-parallel beta-sheets. The upper lobe creates the primary Ca2+ dependent carbohydrates binding site. In contrast to other lectins, for instance, DC-SIGN / DC-SIGNR and MBP, langerin has only one binding site for Ca2+. In the upper lobe, there have been discovered two other binding sites by a crystallization method. These sites are not dependent on Ca2+ and their relation to the primary binding site is not completely understood. All the binding sites are flanked by positively charged amino acids (K299 and K313) which enable binding of negatively charged sulphated carbohydrates. These amino acids are not present in DC-SIGN.

== Function ==
Langerin is expressed in LCs which are located in the epidermis and in vaginal and oral mucosa. LCs are immune cells closely related to macrophages, but by their function, they are more like conventional dendritic cells (cDCs). Langerin recognizes and binds carbohydrates, such as mannose, fucose and N-acetylglucosamine. Thus, LCs may react against pathogens such as HIV-1, Mycobacterium leprae and Candida albicans. After pathogen binding to langerin, fate of the pathogens is not yet understood. It has been proposed that the pathogen is internalised into a cytoplasmatic organelle called Birbeck granule. There, degradation and antigen processing for presentation to T-cells take place. For instance, langerin binds lipoarabinomannans of mycobacteria and inside the Birbeck granules, it contributes to the binding of the antigen to CD1a molecule. In mice, langerin is involved in antigen binding to MHC II glycoproteins and to MHC I glycoproteins during cross-presentation.

It seems an intracellular Src homology domain of langerin is important for the formation of Birbeck granules. These organelles contain Rab11a which is a molecule participating in langerin recycling.

Langerin has similar function and structure as a DCs surface protein DC-SIGN (CD209). Both receptors bind similar antigens via the CRD, for instance Mycobacterium tuberculosis and HIV-1. However, whereas HIV-1 binding to langerin leads to the elimination of the virus, HIV-1 binding to DC-SIGN leads to infection of the cell.

== Clinical significance ==
In human vaginal mucosa, LCs bind the strongly glycosylated glycoprotein gp120 in HIV-1 envelope via langerin. Subsequently, the virus is internalised into the Birbeck granule where it's degraded and processed for presentation. Thus, langerin has an antiviral activity and protects the cell against HIV-1 infection. If langerin is defect or titres of the virus are too high, the HIV-1 infection may happen.

Langerin also binds mannose, which is in the outer membrane of fungi, and beta-glucans in membrane folds of fungi. By this way, LCs can protect themselves against pathogens like Candida, Saccharomyces and Malassezia furfur. Furthermore, langerin recognizes Gal-6-sulfated lactosamine of glioblastoma. In the respiratory epithelium, LCs recognize measles virus via langerin and then, they degrade it and present it to CD4+ T-cells.

== Polymorphism ==
Single nucleotide polymorphism (SNP) in langerin gene may affect the stability as well as the affinity of the protein for some carbohydrates. The most common polymorphism is a replacement of alanine for valine in the 278. position (rs741326). Allelic frequency of this polymorphism is up to 48%, but it probably does not have any influence on stability and affinity of langerin. Substitution of asparagine for aspartic acid in the 288. position leads to 10-fold reduction in the ability to recognize mannose-BSA. A substitution of tryptophane for arginine in the 264. position leads to a loss of Birbeck granules.

== See also ==
- Paul Langerhans
- Langerhans cell
