= Langerhans cell =

Macrophage cell of the skin

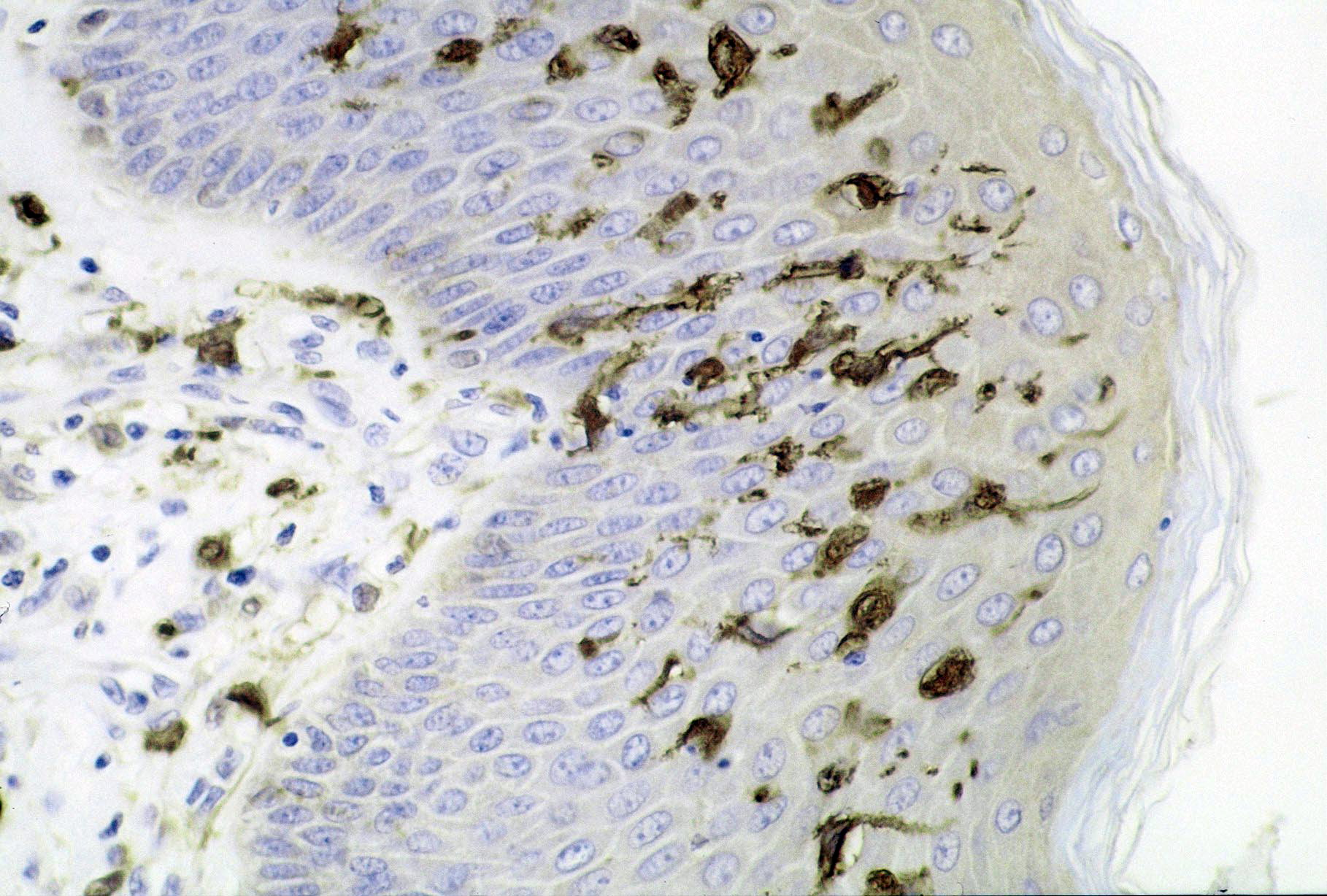
- Section of skin showing large numbers of Langerhans cells in the epidermis. (M. ulcerans infection, S100 immunoperoxidase stain.)

Details
- System: Immune system
- Location: Skin and mucosa
- Function: Dendritic cell

Identifiers
- MeSH: D007801
- FMA: 63072

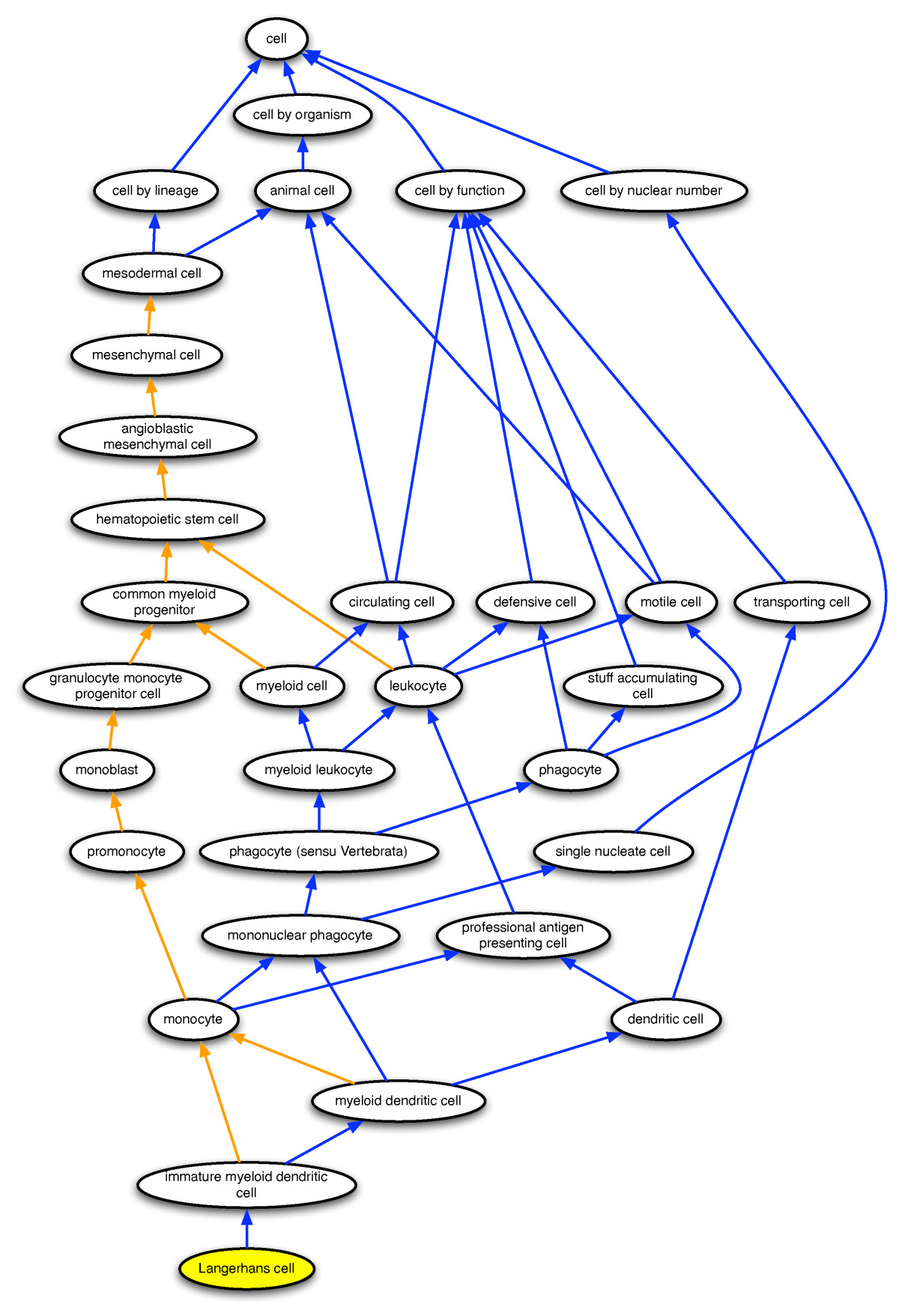
The representation of Langerhans cells in the Cell Ontology. A portion of the Cell Ontology is shown with ovals corresponding to cell types defined in the ontology and arrows corresponding to relations between those cell types. Langerhans cell is represented by a yellow oval; blue arrows correspond to is_a relations, and orange arrows correspond to develops_from relations. Only a subset of Langerhans cell parent types are included in the figure.

A Langerhans cell (LC) is a tissue-resident macrophage of the skin once thought to be a resident dendritic cell. These cells contain organelles called Birbeck granules. They are present in all layers of the epidermis and are most prominent in the stratum spinosum. They also occur in the papillary dermis, particularly around blood vessels, as well as in the mucosa of the mouth, foreskin, and vaginal epithelium. They can be found in other tissues, such as lymph nodes, particularly in association with the condition Langerhans cell histiocytosis (LCH).

== Function ==
In skin infections, the local Langerhans cells take up and process microbial antigens to become fully functional antigen-presenting cells.

Generally, tissue-resident macrophages are involved in immune homeostasis and the uptake of apoptotic bodies. However, Langerhans cells can also take on a dendritic cell-like phenotype and migrate to lymph nodes to interact with naive T-cells.

Matrix metalloproteinase is important and necessary for langerhans cell when it passes stratum basale.

Langerhans cells derive from primitive erythro-myeloid progenitors that arise in the yolk sac outside the embryo in the first trimester of pregnancy, and under normal circumstances persist throughout life, being replenished by local proliferation as necessary. If the skin becomes severely inflamed, perhaps because of infection, blood monocytes are recruited to the affected region and differentiate into replacement LCs.

Langerin is a protein found in Langerhans cells, and dendritic cells.

LCs contain a large amount of cannabinoid receptor type 2 (CB2), that by activation by agonists, attenuate both the recruitment of eosinophils and ear swelling in chronic contact dermatitis induced by repeated challenge.

== Clinical significance ==
=== Langerhans cell histiocytosis ===
In the rare disease Langerhans cell histiocytosis (LCH), an excess of cells similar to these cells are produced. However LCH cells stain positive to CD14 which is a monocyte marker and shows a different, hematopoietic origin for the disorder. LCH can cause damage to skin, bone and other organs.

=== HIV ===
Langerhans cells may be initial cellular targets in the sexual transmission of HIV, and may be a target, reservoir, and vector of dissemination. Langerhans cells have been observed in foreskin, vaginal, and oral mucosa of humans; the lower concentrations in oral mucosa suggest that it is not a likely source of HIV infection relative to foreskin and vaginal mucosa.

=== Human papillomavirus ===
High-risk human papillomaviruses (HPV) are sexually transmitted viruses causally associated with several cancers including cervical, vaginal, anal, and head and neck cancers that cause significant morbidity and mortality worldwide. Over half of all cervical cancer cases are associated with HPV16, the most common of the cancer-causing high-risk genotypes. During its natural life cycle, HPV16 infects the basal cells of the epithelium and interacts with Langerhans cells within the epithelial layer, which are responsible for initiating immune responses against epithelial invading pathogens. However, HPV does not activate Langerhans cells in vitro, and this may represent a key mechanism by which HPV evades immune detection in vivo. Specifically, HPV16 entry into Langerhans cells via the annexin A2/S100A10 heterotetramer results in suppressive signaling and lack of Langerhans cell-mediated immune responses. This Langerhans cell-targeted immune escape mechanism seems to be conserved among different HPV genotypes enabling these viruses to remain undetected in the absence of other inflammatory events. T cells exposed to these inactivated Langerhans cells are not anergic, and can be activated against HPV upon receiving the appropriate stimuli at a later time point.

It was demonstrated that Langerhans cells in HPV-induced cervical lesions were spherical, lacked dendrites, and secreted the suppressive cytokine IL-10 in vivo. The authors further demonstrated that the number of IL-10 secreting immunosuppressive Langerhans cells, and the amount of IL-10 produced in lesions, corresponded with the severity of histopathology and HPV viral load, providing evidence of an active immunosuppressive mechanism employed by HPV that targets Langerhans cells in vivo.

=== Dengue fever ===
Langerhans cells are also the initial target of the virus that causes dengue fever during its development.

=== Declining function during ageing ===
During ageing the capacity of Langerhans cells to migrate declines. This compromises immunity and exposes the skin to infectious diseases and cancer.

== History ==
Langerhans cells are named after Paul Langerhans, a German physician and anatomist, who discovered the cells at the age of 21 while he was a medical student. Because of their dendrite-like appearance, he mistakenly identified the cells as part of the nervous system.

== See also ==
- Langhans giant cell
- List of distinct cell types in the adult human body
