= Birbeck granules =

Organelle found only in Langerhans cells

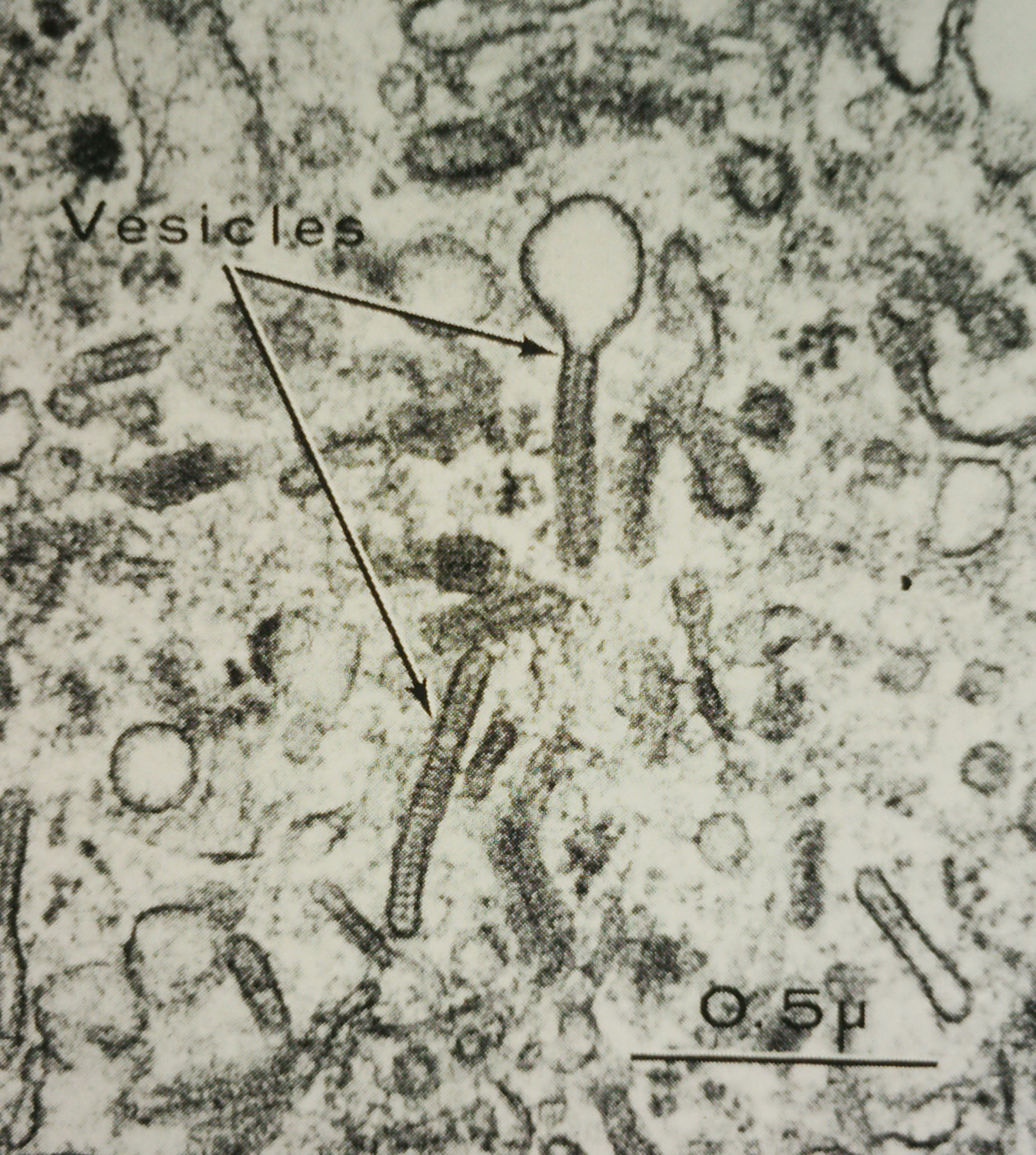
Birbeck granules

Birbeck granules, also known as Birbeck bodies, are rod shaped or "tennis-racket" cytoplasmic organelles found only in Langerhans cells. Their appearance on electron microscopy is with a central linear density and a striated appearance. Although part of normal Langerhans cell histology, they also provide a mechanism to differentiate Langerhans cell histiocytoses (which are a group of rare conditions collectively known as histiocytoses) from proliferative disorders caused by other cell lines. Synthesis of Birbeck granules is mediated by langerin.

== Function ==
The function of Birbeck granules is debated, but one theory is that they migrate to the periphery of the Langerhans cells and release their contents into the extracellular matrix. Another theory is that the Birbeck granule functions in receptor-mediated endocytosis, similar to clathrin-coated pits.

== Role in medical diagnostics ==
For decades, identification of Birbeck granules via electron microscopy was the only reliable way to diagnose Langerhans cell histiocytosis. Later, immunohistochemical staining of CD207 (Langerin) provided a more cost-effective way to diagnose the condition. As a result, the reliance on visual identification of Birbeck granules has decreased over time.

== History ==
Birbeck granules were discovered by Michael Stanley Clive Birbeck (1925–2005), a British scientist and electron microscopist who worked at the Chester Beatty Cancer Research Institute or Institute of Cancer Research, London from 1950 until 1981.
