= Actinic granuloma =

- Other names: O'Brien granuloma
- Specialty: Dermatology
- Causes: Inflammatory response to sun damage and possibly to injured elastic fibers.
- Diagnostic method: Skin biopsy.
- Differential diagnosis: Granuloma annulare and necrobiosis lipoidica.
- Prevention: Sun protection.

Actinic granuloma (AG) was first described by O'Brien in 1975 as a rare granulomatous disease. Lesions appear on sun-exposed areas, usually on the face, neck, and scalp, with a slight preference for middle-aged women. They are typically asymptomatic, single or multiple, annular or polycyclic lesions measuring up to 6 cm in diameter, with slow centrifugal expansion, an erythematous elevated edge, and a hypopigmented, atrophic center.

The granulomatous inflammation is thought to be caused by a cell-mediated autoimmune response against damaged elastic fibers. When actinic granuloma-like lesions appear in non-exposed areas, the rash is known as annular elastolytic giant cell granuloma. Though these can be easily distinguished based on histopathologic features and laboratory findings, the differential diagnosis includes tinea corporis, sarcoidosis, subacute lupus erythematosus, granuloma annulare, and other infectious granulomatous diseases. Chloroquine, intralesional or systemic steroids, cyclosporine, isotretinoin, acitretin, and laser treatment have all been tried with varying degrees of success.

== Signs and symptoms ==
The lesions, which primarily affect sun-exposed areas such as the face, neck, chest, and upper arms, begin as red or skin-colored papules and progress insidiously to annular plaques with uplifted edges and atrophic central skin. Actinic granulomais has been reported to have a slow but self-limited course that can last up to ten years.

== Causes ==
Solar-damaged elastic fibers are thought to be the initial cause of this disease, acting as an antigenic trigger for a CD4+ T-helper cell-mediated granulomatous immune response. It has also been linked to long-term doxycycline use.

== Diagnosis ==
Actinic granuloma is distinguished histopathologically by multinucleated foreign body giant cells that phagocytize the degenerated elastic fibers, a process known as elastophagocytosis. At the solar elastosis level, there is no necrobiosis, such as facial necrobiosis lipoidica, or mucinosis, such as GA or sarcoid-like granuloma in the dermis.

Because of the similarities in clinical manifestations, Actinic granuloma is easily confused with annular granuloma and sarcoidosis. In such cases, a histopathological examination is required. Annular granuloma is characterized by papules that coalesce into annular plaques and preferentially affect the extensor aspects of the extremities. Sarcoidosis lesions, on the other hand, are typically symmetrically distributed on the face, neck, upper trunk, and extremities, particularly within preexisting scars or near sites of prior trauma. Clinically, it appears as red to red-brown papules and plaques that are sometimes violaceous or annular. Sarcoidosis is distinguished histologically by the appearance of superficial and deep dermal epithelioid cell granulomas without prominent lymphocyte or plasma cell infiltrates.

== Treatment ==
Actinic granuloma does not have a specific treatment. Some patients experience spontaneous remission of skin lesions. For widespread AG, systemic glucocorticoids, hydroxychloroquine, and niacinamide are effective, and topical glucocorticoids or retinoids can be used. Actinic granuloma has also been successfully treated with pulsed-dye laser therapy and fractionated carbon dioxide laser therapy.

== See also ==
- Annular elastolytic giant cell granuloma
- List of cutaneous conditions
