= Granuloma multiforme =

- Other names: Mkar disease and Granuloma multiforme (Leiker)
- Specialty: Dermatology

Granuloma multiforme is a cutaneous condition most commonly seen in central Africa, and rarely elsewhere, characterized by skin lesions that are on the upper trunk and arms in sun-exposed areas. It may be confused with tuberculoid leprosy, with which it has clinical similarities. The condition was first noted by Gosset in the 1940s, but it was not until 1964 that Leiker coined the term to describe "a disease resembling leprosy" in his study in Nigeria.

== Signs and symptoms ==
The upper trunk and arms are the main areas affected. The clinical picture differs greatly. Typically, the first lesions are papules, which quickly develop into polycyclic and annular lesions with papular or nodular margins. There might also be plaques that are elevated. Lesions typically leave behind residual hypopigmented macules and extend with central healing over months or years. It irritates and is itchy, particularly when new lesions are developing. The lesions differ from leprosy in that they do not exhibit nerve enlargement, local sensation impairment, or impaired sweating. Also, the lesions never become ulcerated. The illness is a cause of cosmetic disfigurement, but it does not affect the patient's overall health.

== Causes ==
Granuloma multiforme is primarily thought to be caused by cumulative photodamage to the dermal collagen, with the lesions in this condition almost exclusively occurring in sun-exposed areas.

== Diagnosis ==
The best way to understand the histologic features is to look at a radial biopsy with a raised border and central zone. The absence of elastic fibers, the disease's hallmark, is best shown in the central zone using an elastic tissue stain like Verhoeff-Van Gieson's. A zone of transition with granulomatous infiltration is visible on the elevated border. Both a perivascular lymphocytic infiltrate and elastic tissue phagocytosis are seen within the giant cells.

Other conditions that should be taken into account in the differential diagnosis of granuloma multiforme include sarcoidosis, necrobiosis lipoidica diabeticorum, granuloma annulare, and the typical mimic of tuberculoid leprosy, which has sensory impairment and thickening of the nerve trunk but no degenerated collagen. In younger age groups, granuloma annulare is characterized by asymptomatic lesions that histopathologically show increased mucin deposition encircled by a granulomatous zone with a scarcity of giant cells with fewer nuclei. Necrobiosis lipoidica is characterized by a yellow-colored appearance of the plaques, telangiectasia, involvement of the lower limbs, as well as the presence of fibrosis mixed with necrosis, vessel wall changes, and fat deposition in the deep reticular dermis.

== Treatment ==
Although topical steroids have been tried, there is currently no effective treatment for granuloma multiforme.

== See also ==
- Skin lesion
- Granuloma annulare
