= Autoimmune progesterone dermatitis =

- Other names: APD, Autoimmune progesterone urticaria, Progesterone dermatitis.
- Specialty: Dermatology

Autoimmune progesterone dermatitis (APD) occurs during the luteal phase of a woman's menstrual cycle and is an uncommon cyclic premenstrual reaction to progesterone. It can present itself in several ways, including eczema, erythema multiforme, urticaria, angioedema, and progesterone-induced anaphylaxis. The first case of autoimmune progesterone dermatitis was identified in 1964. Reproductive function may be impacted by APD.

== Signs and symptoms ==
Skin lesions can present as purpura, urticaria, erythema multiforme, folliculitis, eczema, papulovesicular eruptions, fixed drug eruptions, or vulvovaginal pruritus. There are also reports of anaphylaxis. Symptoms start to show up three to ten days before the onset of menstruation. APD may affect fertility.

== Mechanism ==
It is unknown exactly what causes APD. The use of exogenous progesterones (OCPs) at the beginning of a patient's treatment may increase the possibility that the antigen will be absorbed by antigen-presenting cells and presented to TH2 cells, which may lead to the subsequent synthesis of IgE. However, this mechanism would not account for the pathogenesis in patients whose APD began before this treatment. Although not all studies have shown it, some authors have proposed that hydrocortisone or 17-α-hydroxyprogesterone may cause initial sensitization due to their cross-sensitivity with progesterone.

== Diagnosis ==
An intradermal progesterone injection test is performed in conjunction with a clinical history to confirm the diagnosis of APD.

A delayed or immediate hypersensitivity reaction could be the cause of APD. As a result, intradermal testing might not show a positive result for 24 to 48 hours. Furthermore, progesterone patch testing has been recommended by some authors to further assess for a hypersensitivity reaction. Notably, certain individuals with typical clinical symptoms of APD who improved after treatment for the disorder did not test negative for intradermal growth factors.

== See also ==
- Autoimmune estrogen dermatitis
- Fixed drug reaction
