= Malum =

Maluym may refer to:

- Malum (film), a 2023 American horror film
- Malum Atoll, Nuguria
- Malum in se, Latin phrase used to refer to conduct assessed as sinful or inherently wrong by nature, independent of regulations governing the conduct
- Malum perforans, long-lasting, usually painless ulcer that penetrates deep into or through the skin, usually on the sole of the foot
- Malum prohibitum, Latin phrase used in law to refer to conduct that constitutes an unlawful act only by virtue of statute
- Shah Malum, 14th-century Sufi Muslim figure in the Sylhet region

== See also ==
- Maloum, a 1999 album by Nawal Al Zoghbi
