= Vulvar childhood pemphigoid =

- Specialty: Dermatology

Vulvar childhood pemphigoid is a cutaneous condition, a childhood form of bullous pemphigoid, peculiar variant with involvement of the genital area and perineum.

== See also ==
- Vesicular pemphigoid
- List of cutaneous conditions
