= Borderline tuberculoid leprosy =

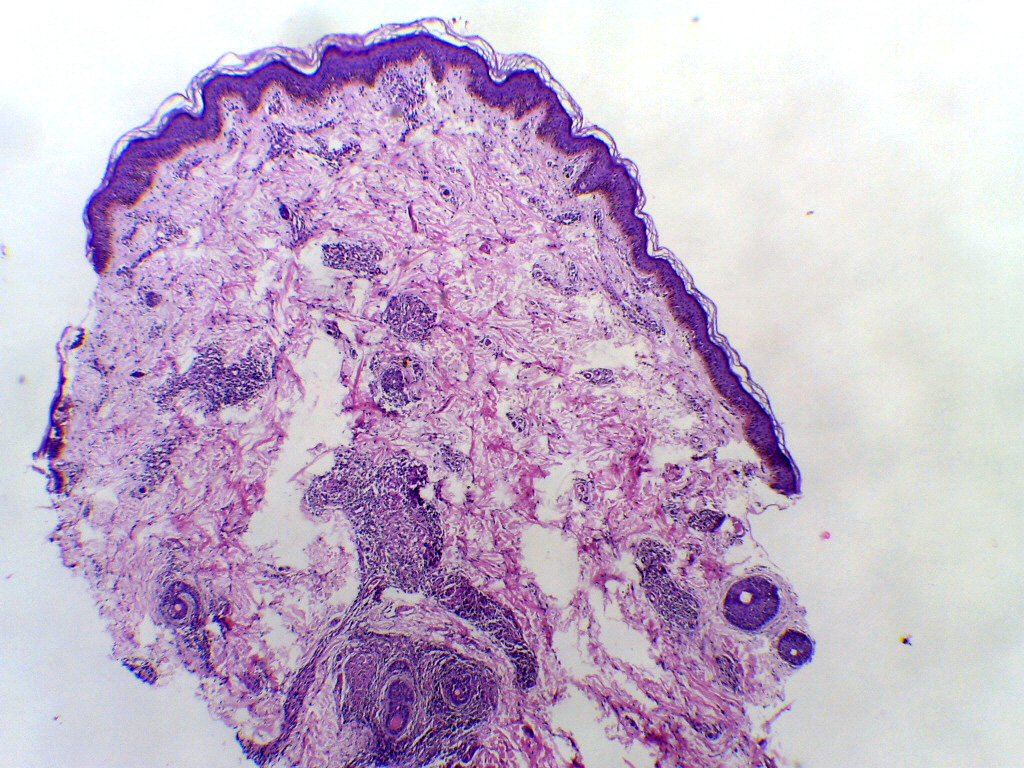
- Section of skin showing epithelioid granulomas in the dermis and reduction in the number of appendages.
- Specialty: Infectious diseases

Borderline tuberculoid leprosy is a cutaneous condition similar to tuberculoid leprosy except the skin lesions are smaller and more numerous.

== See also ==
- Leprosy
- Skin lesion
