= Drug eruption =

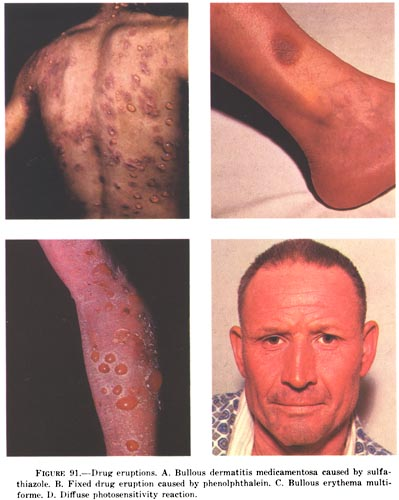
- Examples of drug eruptions. (A) Bullous dermatitis caused by sulfathiazole (B) Fixed drug eruption caused by phenolphtalein (C) Bullous erythema multiforme (D) Diffuse photosensitivity reaction.
- Specialty: Dermatology

In medicine, a drug eruption is an adverse drug reaction of the skin. Most drug-induced cutaneous reactions are mild and disappear when the offending drug is withdrawn. These are called "simple" drug eruptions. However, more serious drug eruptions may be associated with organ injury such as liver or kidney damage and are categorized as "complex". Drugs can also cause hair and nail changes, affect the mucous membranes, or cause itching without outward skin changes.

The use of synthetic pharmaceuticals and biopharmaceuticals in medicine has revolutionized human health, allowing us to live longer lives. Consequently, the average human adult is exposed to many drugs over longer treatment periods throughout a lifetime. This unprecedented rise in pharmaceutical use has led to an increasing number of observed adverse drug reactions.

There are two broad categories of adverse drug reactions. Type A reactions are known side effects of a drug that are largely predictable and are called, pharmatoxicologic. Whereas Type B or hypersensitivity reactions, are often immune-mediated and reproducible with repeated exposure to normal dosages of a given drug. Unlike type A reactions, the mechanism of type B or hypersensitivity drug reactions is not fully elucidated. However, there is a complex interplay between a patient's inherited genetics, the pharmacotoxicology of the drug and the immune response that ultimately give rise to the manifestation of a drug eruption.

Because the manifestation of a drug eruption is complex and highly individual, there are many subfields in medicine that are studying this phenomenon. For example, the field of pharmacogenomics aims to prevent the occurrence of severe adverse drug reactions by analyzing a person's inherited genetic risk. As such, there are clinical examples of inherited genetic alleles that are known to predict drug hypersensitivities and for which diagnostic testing is available.

== Classification ==
Some of the most severe and life-threatening examples of drug eruptions are erythema multiforme, Stevens–Johnson syndrome (SJS), toxic epidermal necrolysis (TEN), hypersensitivity vasculitis, drug induced hypersensitivity syndrome (DIHS), erythroderma and acute generalized exanthematous pustulosis (AGEP). These severe cutaneous drug eruptions are categorized as hypersensitivity reactions and are immune-mediated. There are four types of hypersensitivity reactions and many drugs can induce one or more hypersensitivity reactions.

Hypersensitivity Reactions
Reaction	Description	Mediator	Mechanism	Clinical phenotype
Type I	Immediate	IgE	antigen binds to mast cell/ basophil surface receptors	Urticarial (hives), anaphylaxis, angioedema
TypeII	Antibody-mediated	IgM, IgG	antibody binds antigen leading to complement-driven cell lysis	drug-induced thrombocytopenia, hemolytic anemia, Goodpasture's, ANCA vasculitis
Type III	Immune complex	IgM, IgG, IgA	antigen-antibody complex deposits in tissues-triggers recruitment of leukocytes	Serum sickness, Henoch-Schonlein Purpura
Type IV	Delayed-type	T-lymphocytes	Activated T-cells produce cytokines causing inflammation leading to tissue destruction	Drug reaction with eosinophilia and systemic symptoms (i.e. DRESS syndrome or DIHS), Stevens–Johnson syndrome, toxic epidermal necrolysis, acute generalized exanthematous pustulosis

=== By appearance ===
The most common type of eruption is a morbilliform (resembling measles) or erythematous rash (approximately 90% of cases). Less commonly, the appearance may also be urticarial, papulosquamous, pustular, purpuric, bullous (with blisters) or lichenoid. Angioedema can also be drug-induced (most notably, by angiotensin converting enzyme inhibitors).

=== By mechanism ===
The underlying mechanism can be immunological (such as in drug allergies) or non-immunological (for example, in photodermatitis or as a side effect of anticoagulants). A fixed drug eruption is the term for a drug eruption that occurs in the same skin area every time the person is exposed to the drug. Eruptions can occur frequently with a certain drug (for example, with phenytoin), or be very rare (for example, Sweet's syndrome following the administration of colony-stimulating factors).

=== By drug ===
The culprit can be both a prescription drug or an over-the-counter medication.

Examples of common drugs causing drug eruptions are antibiotics and other antimicrobial drugs, sulfa drugs, nonsteroidal anti-inflammatory drugs (NSAIDs), biopharmaceuticals, chemotherapy agents, anticonvulsants and psychotropic drugs. Common examples include photodermatitis due to local NSAIDs (such as piroxicam) or due to antibiotics (such as minocycline), fixed drug eruption due to acetaminophen or NSAIDs (Ibuprofen), and the rash following ampicillin in cases of mononucleosis.

Certain drugs are less likely to cause drug eruptions (rates estimated to be ≤3 per 1000 patients exposed). These include: digoxin, aluminum hydroxide, multivitamins, acetaminophen, bisacodyl, aspirin, thiamine, prednisone, atropine, codeine, hydrochlorothiazide, morphine, insulin, warfarin and spironolactone.

== Diagnosis and screening tests ==
Drug eruptions are diagnosed mainly from the medical history and clinical examination. However, they can mimic various other conditions, thus delaying diagnosis (for example, in drug-induced lupus erythematosus, or the acne-like rash caused by erlotinib). A skin biopsy, blood tests or immunological tests can also be useful.

Drug reactions have characteristic timing. The typical amount of time it takes for a rash to appear after exposure to a drug can help categorize the type of reaction. For example, Acute generalized exanthematous pustulosis usually occurs within 4 days of starting the culprit drug. Drug Reaction with Eosinophilia and Systemic Symptoms usually occurs between 15 and 40 days after exposure. Toxic epidermal necrolysis and Stevens–Johnson syndrome typically occur 7–21 days after exposure. Anaphylaxis occurs within minutes. Simple exanthematous eruptions occur between 4 and 14 days after exposure.

TEN and SJS are severe cutaneous drug reactions that involve the skin and mucous membranes. To accurately diagnose this condition, a detailed drug history is crucial. Often, several drugs may be causative and allergy testing may be helpful. Sulfa drugs are well known to induce TEN or SJS in certain people. For example, HIV patients have an increased incidence of SJS or TEN compared to the general population and have been found to express low levels of the drug metabolizing enzyme responsible for detoxifying sulfa drugs. Genetics plays an important role in predisposing certain populations to TEN and SJS. As such, there are some FDA recommended genetic screening tests available for certain drugs and ethnic populations to prevent the occurrence of a drug eruption. The most well known example is carbamezepine (an anti-convulsant used to treat seizures) hypersensitivity associated with the presence of HLA-B*5801 genetic allele in Asian populations.

Pharmacogenetic alleles associated with cutaneous drug reactions
Drug	Allele	Population	Clinical syndrome	FDA recommended Pharmacogenetic testing
Abacavir	HLA-B*5701	US European US African Australian	DIHS	Yes
Allopurinol	HLA-B*5801	Han, Korean, Thai, European	SJS, TEN, DIHS	No
Carbamezepine	HLA-B*1502	Han, Thai, Malaysian, Korean	SJS, TEN	Yes
Dapsone	HLA-B*1301	Chinese	DIHS	No
Lamotrigine	HLA-B*38 HLA-B*1502	European, Han	SJS, TEN	no recommendation available
Methazolamide	HLA-B*5901	Korean	SJS, TEN	No
Phenytoin	HLA-B*1502	Thai, Han	SJS, TEN	Warning

DIHS is a delayed onset drug eruption, often occurring a few weeks to 3 months after initiation of a drug. Worsening of systemic symptoms occurs 3–4 days after cessation of the offending drug. There are genetic risk alleles that are predictive of the development of DIHS for particular drugs and ethnic populations. The most important of which is abacavir (an anti-viral used in the treatment of HIV) hypersensitivity associated with the presence of the HLA-B*5701 allele in European and African population in the United States and Australians.

AGEP is often caused by antimicrobial, anti-fungal or antimalarial drugs. Diagnosis is often carried out by patch testing. This testing should be performed within one month after resolution of the rash and patch test results are interpreted at different time points: 48 hours, 72hours and even later at 96 hours and 120 hours in order to improve the sensitivity.

== See also ==
- Fixed drug reaction
- List of cutaneous conditions
- List of human leukocyte antigen alleles associated with cutaneous conditions
- Stevens–Johnson syndrome
