= Waxy skin =

- Specialty: Dermatology

Waxy skin is a cutaneous condition observed in roughly 50% of diabetic patients with chronic disease.

== See also ==
- Diabetic dermadromes
- Limited joint mobility
- Skin lesion
