= Annular elastolytic giant-cell granuloma =

- Specialty: Dermatology

Annular elastolytic giant-cell granuloma (also known as "Giant cell elastophagocytosis," "Meischer's granuloma," "Miescher's granuloma of the face") is a cutaneous condition characterized histologically by a dermal infiltrate of macrophages.

== Signs and symptoms ==
The most common presentation of annular elastolytic giant-cell granuloma is one or more annular or ring-shaped patches with elevated borders, atrophy, and central hypopigmentation. Generalized papular lesions may also be observed. Although it sporadically affects covered areas as well, annular elastolytic giant-cell granuloma is generally thought to be a disease that primarily affects sun-exposed areas.

== Diagnosis ==
Histopathologically, an annular elastolytic giant-cell granuloma exhibits a granulomatous reaction accompanied by phagocytosis of the elastic fibers, elastolysis, and multinucleate giant cells devoid of or reduced in elastin fibers. Other hallmarks of the histopathology include the lack of mucin deposition and collagen necrobiosis.

== Treatment ==
The handling of these cases is debatable, with differing results from topical treatments using tacrolimus, retinoids, and corticosteroids, and systemic treatments using methotrexate, isotretinoin, clofazimine, acitretin, and hydroxychloroquine.

== See also ==
- Actinic granuloma
- List of cutaneous conditions
