= Coma blister =

Skin lesion or blister caused by pressure

A coma blister, or coma bullae, is a skin lesion or blister that typically arises due to pressure in an individual with impaired consciousness. They vary in size, ranging from 4 to 5 centimeters in diameter, and may appear hemorrhagic or blood filled. Coma blisters are usually found in the extremities and trunk. These types of blisters have been associated with the overdose of central nervous system (CNS) depressants especially barbiturates, but also tricyclic antidepressants, hypnotics, benzodiazepines, opiates, antipsychotics, and alcohol. However, studies have found that coma blisters are not caused by the toxicity of these drugs, but due to hypoxia and external pressure on the comatose individual's skin from being immobilized. Coma blisters have been frequently found on individuals who have overdosed on drugs, but have also been found on individuals with chronic kidney failure, hypercalcemia, diabetic ketoacidosis, and a variety of neurologic conditions. Coma blisters are more frequent in adults and less common among children as demonstrated by the few cases published in literature.

== Etiology ==
The development of coma blisters derives from various causes in the setting of neurologic disease and other conditions, with crucial factors being inadequate amounts of oxygen at the tissue level and external pressure. Examples of neurological disorders that are associated with coma blisters include cranioencephalic trauma, cerebrovascular disease, and meningoencephalitis. Metabolic disorders such as diabetic ketoacidosis, hyperkalemia, and hypoglycemia are also associated with blister formation. Drug overdose-induced comas are one of the most frequent predisposing factors of coma blister formation, where studies have reported the development of coma blisters in 4% of barbiturate overdose. Recent studies also suggested that immune mechanisms play a role in the etiology of these blisters, specifically in the drug induced comas. IgG, IgA, and C_{3} with fibrin are seen with direct immunoflourence staining. Despite there being multiple causes of unconscious states, a common reoccurrence and feature of coma blisters include the death of body tissue or necrosis in the eccrine sweat glands. However, it is still possible to see coma blisters in non-comatose individuals with granulomatosis with polyangiitis or long immobilization.

Constant pressure forms blisters by causing tissue injury to the vessel walls, thereby interrupting blood and oxygen flow to the tissues. This constant pressure is often caused by a reflex mechanism to counteract the low arterial blood pressure exacerbated by vasoactive drugs or shock. A lack of oxygen to local tissue leads to the formation of necrotic bullae and the deterioration of the eccrine sweat glands, where metabolically active cells are present. As a result of pressure, coma blisters most commonly develop on pressure points such as the ankles, heels, knees, elbows, fingers, and toes.

Administration of antidepressants, antipsychotics, barbiturates, benzodiazepines, ethanol, or opioids are often connected to drug overdose-induced comas because of their vasoactive properties and possible toxicity to eccrine sweat glands. Due to the overusage of vasoactive drugs, more pressure is applied to the arterial walls, thereby increasing the risk of tissue damage, loss of oxygen to local tissue, and blister formation.

Blisters occur specifically at vasoactive pressure sites between 48 and 72 hours after the start of unconsciousness. Although some lesions may heal on their own, the diagnosis of coma blisters are aided with specific histological characteristics.

== Diagnosis ==
Coma blisters usually develop on pressure point sites within a few days on individuals who have been immobilized due to external events. Barbiturate overdose is the most frequent predisposing event, but coma or any other condition that renders an individual unconscious can lead to the formation of coma blisters. These blisters resolve on their own within one to two weeks, and their diagnosis can be further characterized by histological evidence such as subepidermal bullae, focal necrosis of the epidermis, dermis, subcutaneous tissue, and all epidermal appendages. For non-drug-induced coma blisters, the absence of inflammation along with the presence of thrombosis in dermal wall vessels are the two most significant differences from drug overdose-induced coma blisters. Necrosis of sweat glands and ducts usually occur in coma blisters, but its absence does not exclude the diagnosis. In children, diagnosis may be dependent on careful clinicopathological correlation to omit other blistering diseases.

=== Differential diagnosis ===
==== Friction blisters ====
Friction blisters are only found in areas that undergo repetitive friction. This type of blister is caused by frictional forces in which the epidermal cells are separated mechanically at the level of the stratum spinosum. Hydrostatic pressure causes the area of the separation to fill with fluid, a bullae that is characteristic for blisters.

==== Edema blisters ====
Edema Blisters form at the sites of swelling from acute volume overload, also as known as edema. Edema can occur for various reasons that may include renal or heart failure. Histopathology may show subepidermal edema, and a negative immunofluorescence staining may be performed to differentiate acute edema blisters from other bullous diseases.

==== Bullous diabeticorum ====
Bullous diabeticorum occurs in individuals with diabetes mellitus. Since the majority of diabetic individuals with bullous diabeticorum have nephropathy and neuropathy, it is suggested that the premature aging of local subbasement membrane zone connective-tissue may lead to these types of blisters.

==== Epidermolysis bullosa ====
Epidermolysis bullosa (EB) is a genetic disease that causes the skin to be extremely fragile, and individuals with the disease are prone to blisters, even with minimal friction and trauma. There are thirty subtypes of epidermolysis bullosa, which are arranged into four major categories: EB simplex (EBS), dystrophic EB (DEB), Kindler EV, and junctional EB (JEB). There is currently no cure for epidermolysis bullosa, and treatment is based on bandaging, wound management, and pain management.

Bullous pemphigoid

Bullous pemphigoid is an autoimmune bullous disease that mainly affects older individuals. Individuals typically present with itchy rashes that transform into fluid filled bullous lesions on the skin. Although these blisters usually appear on the arms, legs, and trunk of the body, they can also be found in the mouth as sores. The most common treatment options for blisters caused by bullous pemphigoid are topical and systemic corticosteroids, which help to relieve itching and heal the blistering skin.

== Treatment and management ==
Coma blisters typically do not require treatment and will usually heal on their own within one to two weeks of formation. Early identification and management of coma blisters is important and involves treating any underlying conditions that may have led to the formation of the blisters and decreasing the risk of subsequent infections.

Before starting any treatment, it is important to rule out other cases of potential bullous diseases, such as epidermolysis bullosa, bullous pemphigoid, bullous amyloidosis, and epidermolysis bullosa acquisita, since bullous lesions of the skin are characteristic in these conditions. It is also important to differentiate coma blisters from other types of dermatologic lesions, such as friction blisters and edema blisters, as their characteristics may also be similar to coma blisters. If treatment is needed, a possible option is topical antibiotics, which can be used to prevent infections of the blisters.

Management and wound care can also be performed and involve sterile drainage of the blister, positioning the individual away from their wound to relieve any pressure on the site, and preventing the formation of pressure ulcerations. When draining the blisters, leaving the roof of the blister undamaged can allow the roof to act as an additional layer of dressing for the wound, and the use of hydrocolloid dressings can also help to maintain moisture and promote healing. Some individuals may experience visible scarring in the area after the blisters have healed, but this is non-concerning.

Coma blisters are not seen as contraindications for other medications or therapies; therefore, medications should be continued as needed to manage other co-morbidities even in the presence of coma blisters.

== See also ==
- Friction blister – Skin condition that may occur at sites of combined pressure and friction
- Edema blister – Skin condition associated with chronic edema
- Diabetic bulla – Noninflammatory, spontaneous, painless blister, associated with diabetes
- Epidermolysis bullosa – Rare medical conditions that result in easy blistering of the skin and mucous membranes
- List of skin conditions
