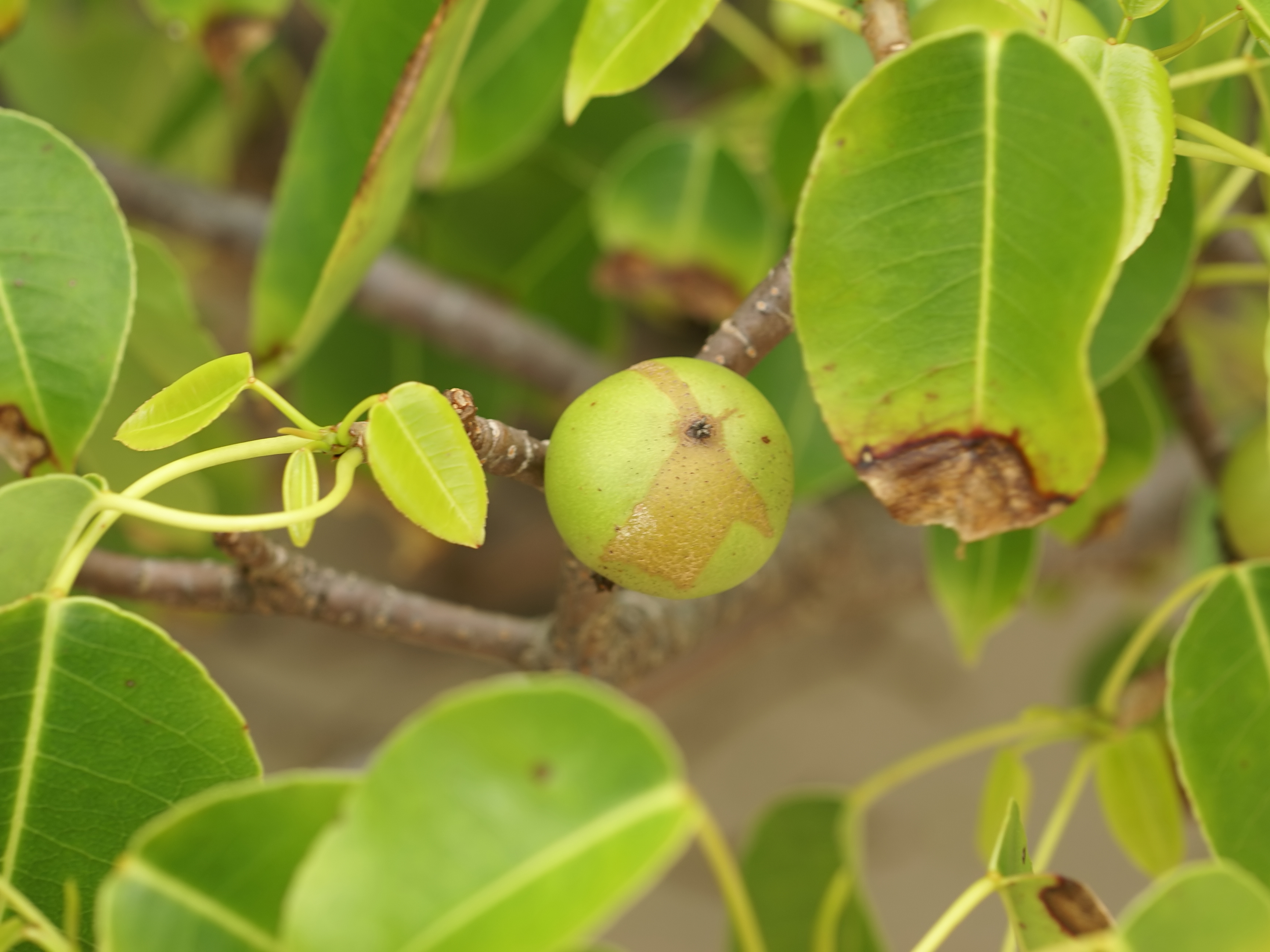
- Fruit and foliage

Conservation status
- Least Concern (IUCN 3.1)

- Secure (NatureServe)

Scientific classification
- Kingdom: Plantae
- Clade: Tracheophytes
- Clade: Angiosperms
- Clade: Eudicots
- Clade: Rosids
- Order: Malpighiales
- Family: Euphorbiaceae
- Genus: Hippomane
- Species: H. mancinella

Binomial name
- Hippomane mancinella L.

Synonyms
- Hippomane dioica Rottb.; Mancinella venenata Tussac.

= Manchineel =

Manchineel tree

Poisonous plant from tropical North and South America

The manchineel tree (Hippomane mancinella), also known as the tree of death, is a species of flowering plant in the spurge family (Euphorbiaceae). Its native range stretches from tropical southern North America to northern South America.

The name manchineel (sometimes spelled manchioneel or manchineal), as well as the specific epithet mancinella, are from Spanish manzanilla ('little apple'), from the superficial resemblance of its fruit and leaves to those of an apple tree. It is also called beach apple.

A present-day Spanish name is manzanilla de la muerte, 'little apple of death'. This refers to the fact that manchineel is one of the most toxic trees in the world: It has milky-white sap that contains numerous toxins and can cause blistering. The sap is present in every part of the tree: bark, leaves, and fruit.

== Description ==
Hippomane mancinella grows up to 15 metres (49 feet) tall. It has reddish-grayish bark, small greenish-yellow flowers, and shiny green leaves. The leaves are simple, alternate, very finely serrated or toothed, and 5–10 centimetres (2–4 inches) long.

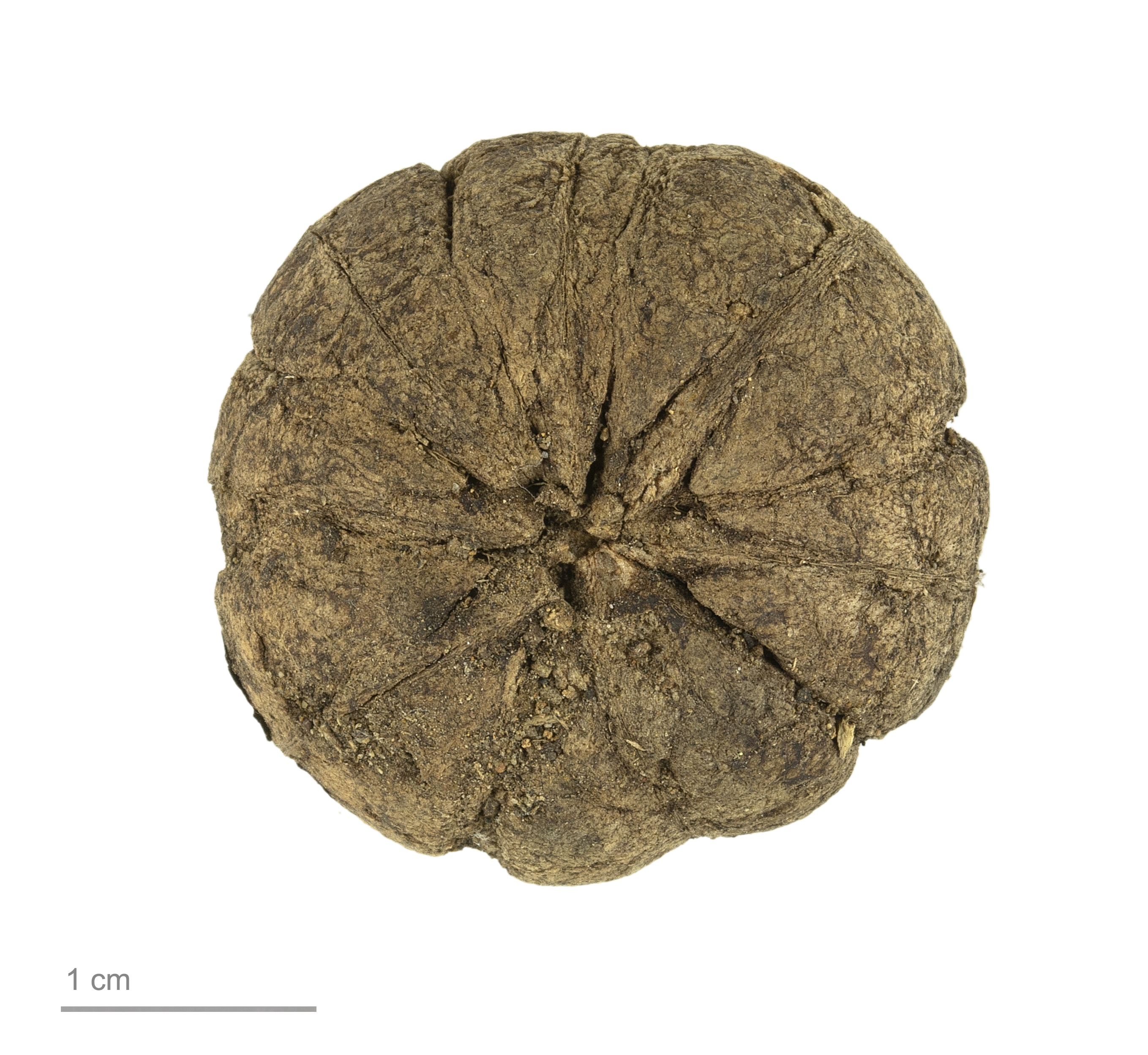
Hippomane mancinella MHNT

Spikes of small greenish flowers are followed by fruits, which are similar in appearance to an apple, are round-shaped and are green or greenish-yellow when ripe. The fruit is poisonous, as is every other part of the tree.

== Distribution and habitat ==
Manchineel is native to the Caribbean, the U.S. state of Florida, the Bahamas, Mexico, Central America, and northern South America.

The manchineel tree can be found on coastal beaches and in brackish swamps, where it grows among mangroves. It provides excellent natural windbreaks and its roots stabilize the sand, thus reducing beach erosion.

== Conservation ==
The manchineel tree is listed as an endangered species in Florida.

== Toxicity ==
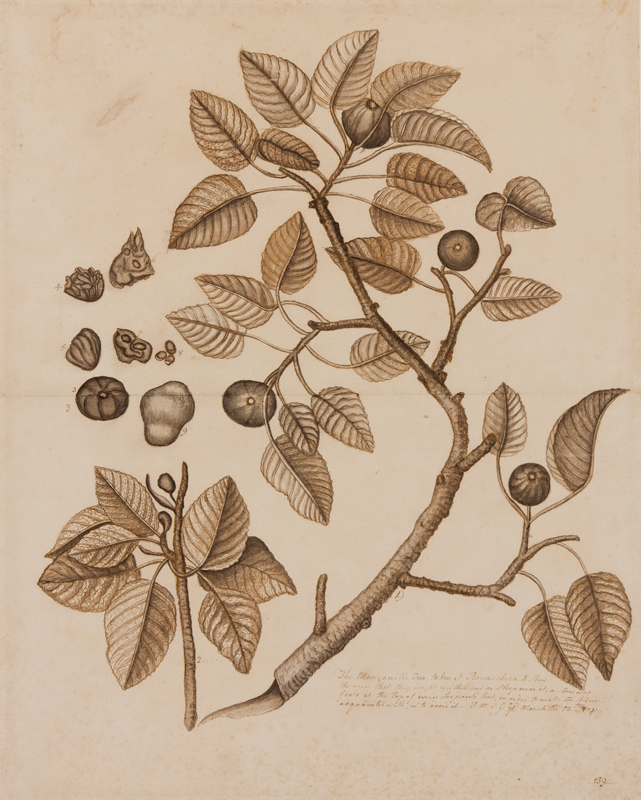
Botanical study, captioned "The Manzanilla Tree taken at Bocca chica to show / the men that they might neither cut nor sleep near it, a bow was pinned at the top of every Sergeant's tent, in order to make the soldiers / acquainted with and to avoid it... F.M: J.G: (?) March the 12th 1741" – a reference to Vice Admiral Edward Vernon's invasion fleet, before his defeat at the Battle of Cartagena de Indias

All parts of the tree contain strong toxins. The tree contains 12-deoxy-5-hydroxyphorbol-6-gamma-7-alpha-oxide, furocoumarins, sapogenines, hippomanins, mancinellin and other phorbol esters, which are responsible for the manchineel's toxicity.

Its milky white sap produces strong allergic contact dermatitis. Standing beneath the tree during rain will cause blistering of the skin from mere contact with this liquid: even a small drop of rain with the sap in it will cause the skin to blister. Burning the tree may cause ocular injuries if the smoke reaches the eyes. Contact with its milky sap (latex) produces bullous dermatitis, acute keratoconjunctivitis and possibly large corneal epithelial defects.

Although the fruit is potentially fatal if eaten, no such occurrences have been reported in modern literature. Ingestion can produce severe gastroenteritis with bleeding, shock, and bacterial superinfection, as well as the potential for airway compromise due to edema.

When ingested, the fruit is reportedly "pleasantly sweet" at first, with a subsequent "strange peppery feeling ... gradually progress[ing] to a burning, tearing sensation and tightness of the throat." Symptoms continue to worsen until the patient can "barely swallow solid food because of the excruciating pain and the feeling of a huge obstructing pharyngeal lump."

In some parts of its range, many trees carry a warning sign – for example on the island Curaçao – while others are marked with a red "X" on the trunk to indicate danger. In the French Antilles the trees are often marked with a painted red band roughly 1 metre (3 ft) above the ground.

Although the plant is toxic to many birds and other animals, the black-spined iguana (Ctenosaura similis) is known to eat the fruit and even live among the limbs of the tree.

A poultice of arrowroot (Maranta arundinacea) was used by the Arawak and Taíno as an antidote against such poisons. The Caribs were known to poison the water supply of their enemies with the leaves. Spanish explorer Juan Ponce de León died shortly after an injury incurred in battle with the Calusa in Florida—being struck by an arrow that had been poisoned with manchineel sap.

== Uses ==
Despite the inherent dangers associated with handling it, the tree has been used as a source of wood by Caribbean furniture makers for centuries. It must be cut and left in the sun to dry the sap. To avoid dangerous contact with the poisonous parts, the tree may be burnt at the base to fell it.

== Historical accounts ==
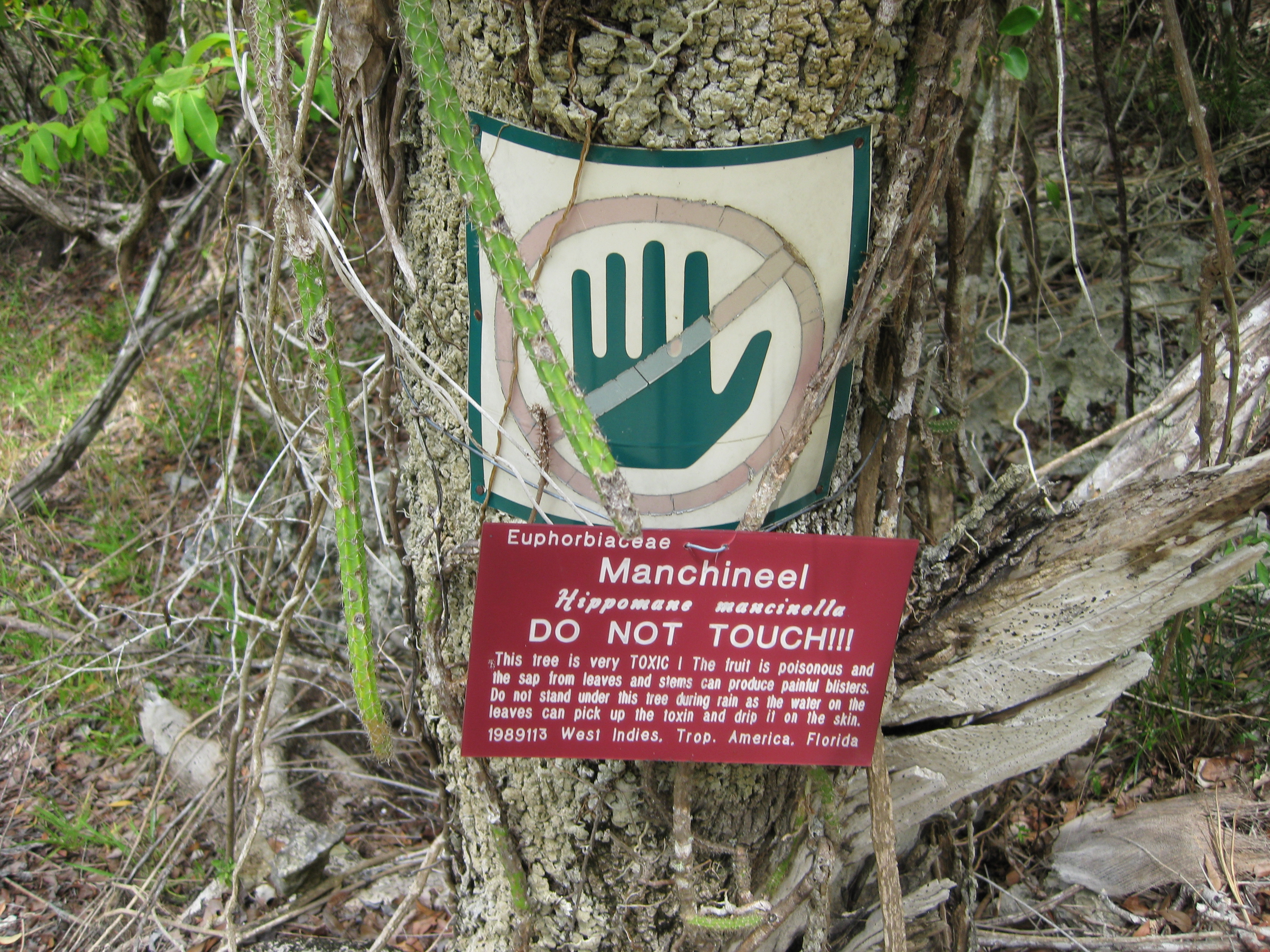
Manchineel trees are often signposted as dangerous.

- William Wade Ellis, ship's surgeon for James Cook on his final voyage, wrote:

On the fourth, a party of men were sent to cut wood, as the island apparently afforded plenty of that article; amongst other trees they unluckily cut down several of the manchineel, the juice of which getting into their eyes, rendered them blind for several days. There is no record of the wood being burnt.

- Alexandre Exquemelin wrote in The Buccaneers of America of his experience with the "tree called mancanilla, or dwarf-apple-tree" when in Hispaniola:

One day being hugely tormented with mosquitoes or gnats, and as yet unacquainted with the nature of this tree, I cut a branch thereof, to serve me instead of a fan, but all my face swelled the next day and filled with blisters, as if it were burnt to such a degree that I was blind for three days.

- Nicholas Cresswell, in his journal entry for Friday, September 16, 1774, mentions:

The Mangeneel Apple has the smell and appearance of an English Apple, but small, grows on large trees, generally along the Seashore. They are rank poison. I am told that one apple is sufficient to kill 20 people. This poison is of such a malignant nature that a single drop of rain or dew that falls from the tree upon your skin will immediately raise a blister. Neither Fruit or Wood is of any use, that I can learn.

== In popular culture ==
- In Giacomo Meyerbeer's opera L'Africaine (1865), the heroine Sélika dies by inhaling the perfume of the manchineel tree's blossoms.
- In the story "The Beckoning Hand", in the 1887 collection of that name by Grant Allen, a manchineel (spelled "manchineal" here) leaf is rolled in a cigarette in an attempt to poison a person.
- In the film Wind Across the Everglades (1958), a notorious poacher named Cottonmouth (played by Burl Ives) ties a victim to the trunk of a manchineel tree, which a character explains as "the only tree that carves its initials into you."
- The tree is recorded as the world's most dangerous tree by Guinness World Records.
- In the television series Death in Paradise (series 13, episode 3), a person is killed by being given small doses of poison from the tree.
- In the book series Wings of Fire, the plant was referenced in book 13.
- In the book Wicked Plants: The Weed That Killed Lincoln's Mother and Other Botanical Atrocities by Amy Stewart, the plant is used for an example in one chapter
- In the reality series Expedition X episode "Terrors of Trinidad", host Phil Torres points the tree out to fellow host Heather Amaro, saying "eat the fruit, you die. Burn the wood, you can go blind", after referring to it as the "Death Tree".

== See also ==
- Hura crepitans
- Bahamian dry forests
- Saba
- Cape Sable, Florida
