= Dermopathy =

Dermopathy can refer to one of several diseases:

- Diabetic dermopathy
- Graves' dermopathy, or infiltrative dermopathy
- Nephrogenic fibrosing dermopathy (NFD)
- Restrictive dermopathy
