= Diabetic dermadrome =

Skin conditions commonly associated with diabetes

- Specialty: Dermatology

Diabetic dermadromes constitute a group of cutaneous conditions commonly seen in people with diabetes with longstanding disease. Conditions included in this group are:

- Acral dry gangrene
- Carotenosis
- Diabetic dermopathy
- Diabetic bulla
- Diabetic cheiroarthropathy
- Malum perforans
- Necrobiosis lipoidica
- Limited joint mobility is observed in roughly 30% of people with diabetes with longstanding disease.
- Scleredema
- Waxy skin is observed in roughly 50%.

== See also ==
- List of cutaneous conditions
