= Leiker =

Leiker is a surname. Notable people with the surname include:

- Jeff Leiker (born 1962), American community college sports administrator, and football player and coach
- Tony Leiker (born 1964), American football player

== See also ==
- Granuloma multiforme
- Leikert
