= Generalized bullous fixed drug eruption =

- Other names: Bullous drug eruption, multilocular bullous fixed drug eruption
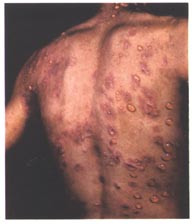
- Drug eruption: Bullous dermatitis medicamentosa caused by sulfathiazole.
- Specialty: Dermatology

Generalized bullous fixed drug eruption (GBFDE) most commonly refers to a drug reaction in the erythema multiforme group. These are uncommon reactions to medications, with an incidence of 0.4 to 1.2 per million person-years for toxic epidermal necrolysis and 1.2 to 6.0 per million person-years for Stevens–Johnson syndrome. The primary skin lesions are large erythemas (faintly discernible even after confluence), most often irregularly distributed and of a characteristic purplish-livid color, at times with flaccid blisters.

== Signs and symptoms ==
A rare and severe variation of fixed drug eruption, generalized bullous fixed drug eruption involves blisters and erosions involving at least 10% of the body's surface area, affecting three of the six anatomic sites: the head and neck, the anterior and posterior trunk, the upper and lower extremities, and the genitalia.

== Causes ==
Fixed drug eruptions are linked to anti-infective (ß-lactam antibiotics, tinidazole, and acyclovir), analgesics (acetaminophen (paracetamol), mefenamic acid, and metamizole), non-steroidal anti-inflammatory drugs (NSAIDs), anti-epileptic (carbamazepine), psychoactive (barbiturates, codeine, and others), and other miscellaneous medications (omeprazole, contrast media, loratadine, and allopurinol).

== Diagnosis ==
In cases where the clinical presentation is unclear, a skin biopsy may be necessary to confirm the diagnosis of GBFDE. A subepidermal blister or denuded epidermis, vacuolar alterations at the dermo-epidermal junction, and a variable number of necrotic keratinocytes within the lesional intact epidermis are characteristic histopathologic findings of GBFDE.

== Treatment ==
Antihistamines and topical steroids are used in symptomatic therapy. Antibiotics should be given if an infection is thought to be present. It is also important to counsel the patient to stay away from the offending medication.

== See also ==
- Skin lesion
- List of cutaneous conditions
