= Generalized granuloma annulare =

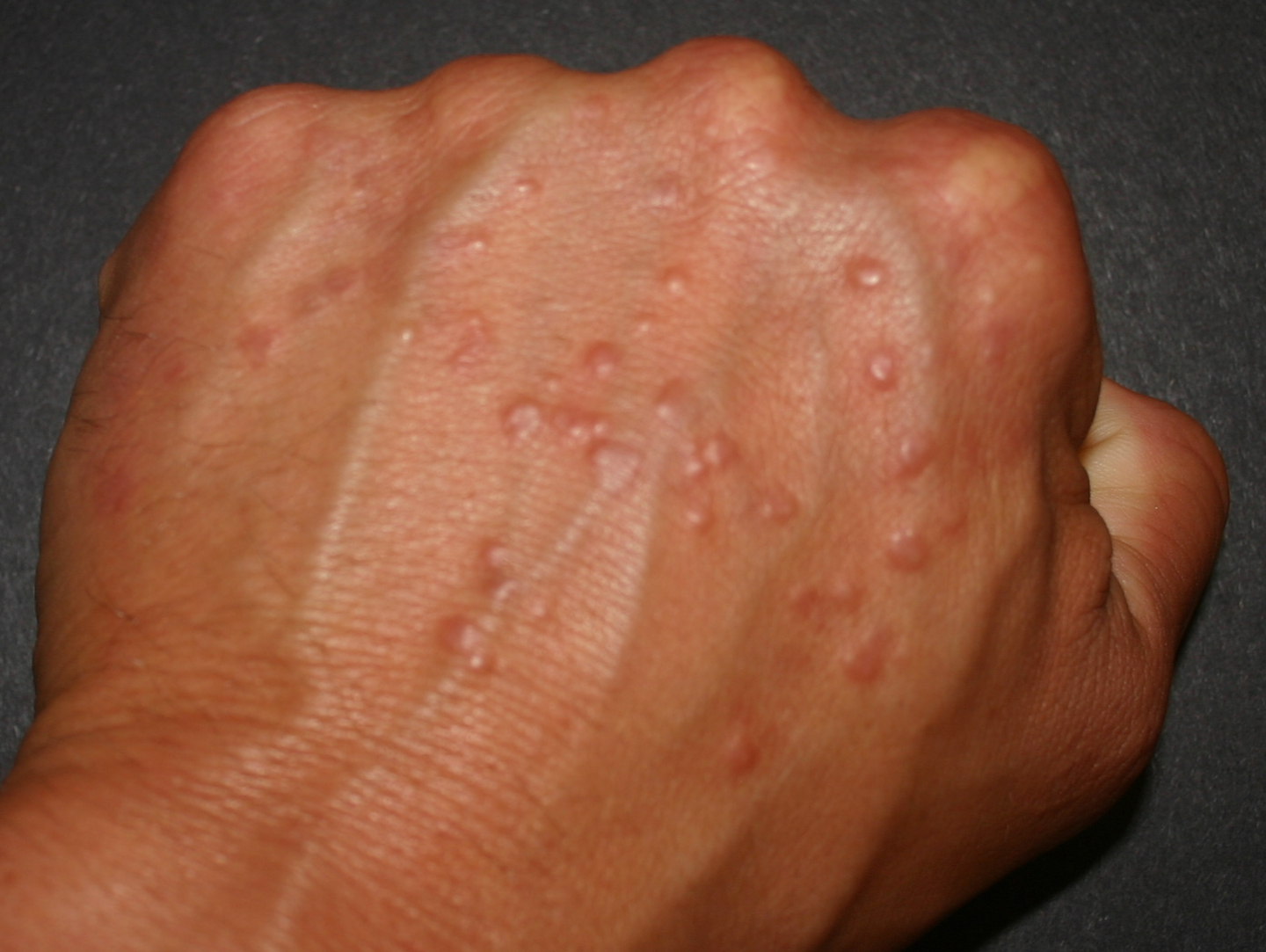
- Specialty: Dermatology

Generalized granuloma annulare is a skin condition of unknown cause, tending to affect women in the fifth and sixth decades, presenting as a diffuse but symmetrical, papular or annular eruption of more than ten skin lesions, and often hundreds.

== Signs and symptoms ==
Generalized granuloma annulare is a chronic granulomatous dermatosis that typically affects young adults' distal extremities and manifests as annular grouped papules. On the trunk and extremities, numerous flesh-colored papules arranged in an annular pattern are the hallmark of generalized granuloma annulare. These lesions are frequently itchy, in contrast to the traditional presentation.

== Causes ==
A variety of factors, such as infection, sun exposure, medication use, and trauma, appear to play a role in the development of the disease.

== Diagnosis ==
It has been observed that certain laboratory abnormalities exist, such as hyperlipidemia, hypergammaglobulinemia, and the presence of circulating antinuclear antibodies. Histopathologic analysis may show lymphohistiocytic granuloma-related alterations primarily in the papillary and mid dermis. Palisaded or interstitial patterns, or a combination of the two, may be seen in inflammatory infiltrates.

== Treatment ==
Generalized granuloma annulare is mostly treated with phototherapy as opposed to oral steroids, however treatment efficacy is constrained by a high rate of recurrence after stopping treatment.

== Epidemiology ==
Generalized granuloma annulare accounts for up to 15% of granuloma annulare cases.

== See also ==
- Granuloma annulare
- List of cutaneous conditions
- List of human leukocyte antigen alleles associated with cutaneous conditions
