= Patch-type granuloma annulare =

- Specialty: Dermatology

Patch-type granuloma annulare (also known as macular granuloma annulare) is a skin condition of unknown cause, more commonly affecting women between 30 and 70 years of age, characterized by flat or slightly palpable erythematous or red-brown skin lesions.

== See also ==
- Granuloma annulare
- Skin lesion
