= Subcutaneous granuloma annulare =

Skin disease

- Other names: Deep granuloma annulare, and Pseudorheumatoid nodule
- Specialty: Dermatology

Subcutaneous granuloma annulare is a skin condition of unknown cause, most commonly affecting children, with girls affected twice as commonly as boys, characterized by painless skin lesions most often on the lower legs. It's also seen in the upper limbs and head, but it rarely occurs in the trunk.

== See also ==
- Granuloma annulare
- Skin lesion
- List of cutaneous conditions
