= Localized granuloma annulare =

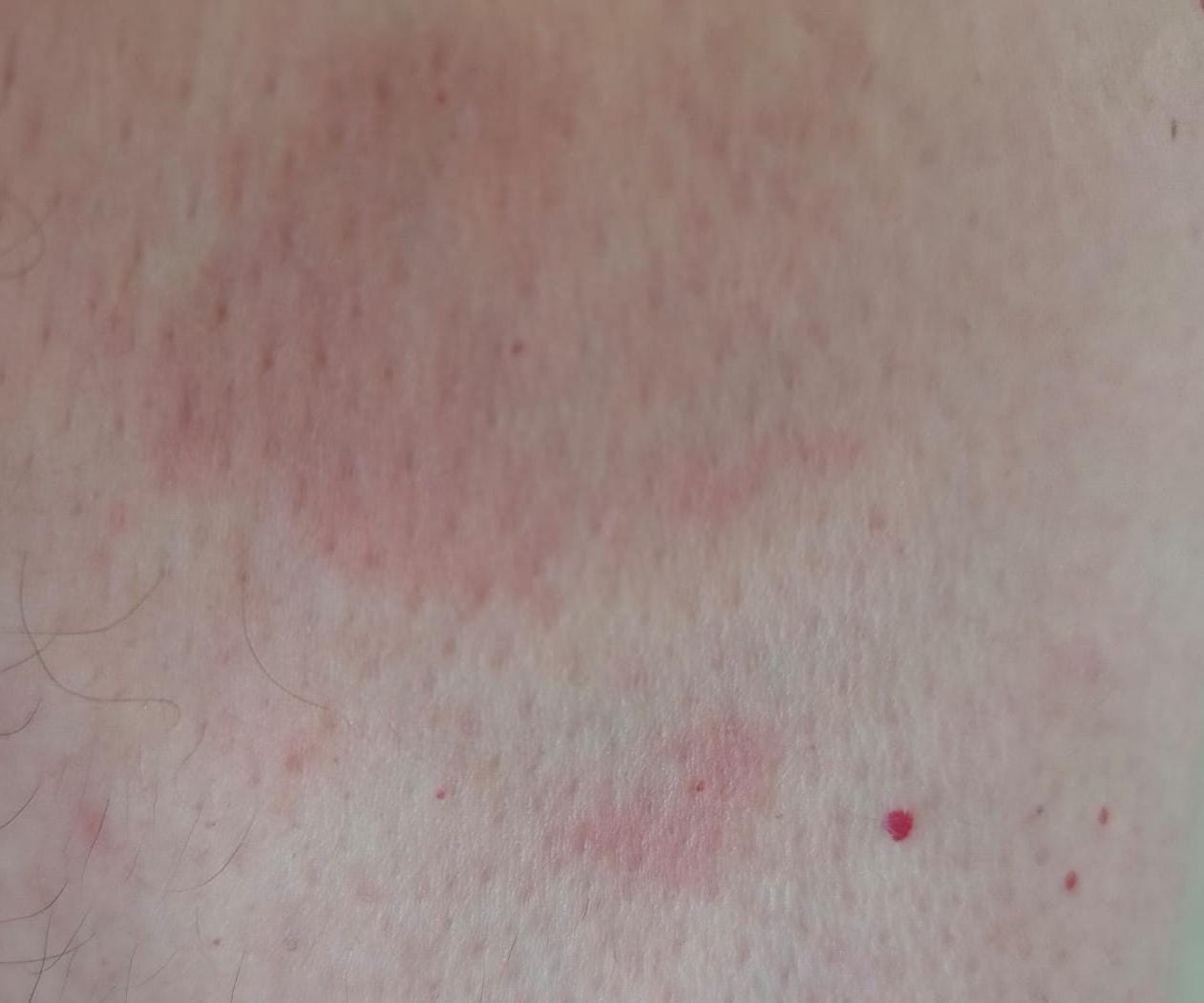
- Localized granuloma annulare
- Specialty: Dermatology

Localized granuloma annulare is a skin condition of unknown cause, tending to affect children and young to middle-aged adults, usually appearing on the lateral or dorsal surfaces of the fingers or hands, elbows, dorsal feet, and ankles.

== See also ==
- Granuloma annulare
- Skin lesion
