= Edema blister =

Skin condition associated with chronic edema

- Other names: Edema bulla, hydrostatic bulla, stasis blister.
- Specialty: Dermatology

Edema blisters, also known as edema bulla, hydrostatic bulla, and stasis blister, is a cutaneous condition that develop in patients with an acute exacerbation of chronic edema, particularly of the lower extremities, and in the setting of anasarca.

== See also ==
- Delayed blister
- List of cutaneous conditions
