= Leikert =

Leikert is a surname. Notable people with the surname include:

- František Leikert (1914–?), Czech diver
- Katja Leikert (Katja Rüb, born 1975), German politician

== See also ==
- Leiker
