= Delayed blister =

- Specialty: Dermatology

Delayed blisters is a cutaneous condition observed weeks to months after the initial healing of second-degree thermal burns, donor sites of split-thickness skin grafts, and recipient sites of split-thickness skin grafts.

== See also ==
- Coma blister
- List of cutaneous conditions
