= Vesicular pemphigoid =

- Specialty: Dermatology

Vesicular pemphigoid is a cutaneous condition, a clinical variant of bullous pemphigoid, characterized by a dermatitis herpetiformis-like presentation with grouped small tense blisters.

== See also ==
- Bullosis diabeticorum
- List of cutaneous conditions
