= Perforating granuloma annulare =

- Specialty: Dermatology

Perforating granuloma annulare (PGA) is a skin condition of unknown cause, usually appearing on the dorsal hands, presenting as papules with a central keratotic core.

== Signs and symptoms ==
Perforating granuloma annulare is characterized by flesh-to-red, umbilicated papules or pustules that range in size from 1 to 5 mm. These papules are frequently arranged in an annular form and frequently have an exudate, crusting, or scaling covering them. It is possible to characterize the distribution of PGA as either generalized or localized, since only 9% of patients initially present with a single lesion.

== Causes ==
The cause of perforating granuloma annulare is unknown.

== Diagnosis ==
Granulomas containing histiocytes arranged in a palisading pattern surround necrobiotic collagen, which is usually represented by the deposition of mucin and infrequently fibrin, according to the histopathologic features of PGA. Furthermore, the epidermis is perforated and necrobiotic material is expelled as a result of the granulomas' location in the superficial reticular dermis.

== Treatment ==
Complete excision, psoralen and UVA therapy, intralesional triamcinolone, and high-dose corticosteroids are among the PGA treatment options.

== See also ==
- Granuloma annulare
- Skin lesion
