= Diabetic cheiroarthropathy =

- Other names: Limited joint mobility, or LJM
- Specialty: Rheumatology

Diabetic cheiroarthropathy, also known as diabetic stiff hand syndrome or limited joint mobility syndrome, is a cutaneous condition characterized by waxy, thickened skin and limited joint mobility of the hands and fingers, leading to flexion contractures, a condition associated with diabetes mellitus and it is observed in roughly 30% of diabetic patients with longstanding disease. It can be a predictor for other diabetes-related complications and was one of the earliest known complications of diabetes, first documented in 1974.

== Presentation ==
In the fingers, diabetic cheiroarthropathy can cause such extreme limited mobility that the patient is unable to fully extend the fingers in order to flatten the hand. Typically, both hands are afflicted by diabetic cheiroarthropathy, with most patients finding stiffness beginning in the little finger and spreading to the thumb. Most times, just smaller, more fragile joints are affected by it, with larger joints usually only being affected in patients with more severe or more advanced cases of diabetes.

== Diagnosis ==
A classic test is the prayer sign which is the inability to place hands together in a praying position with the fingers fanned and to press together the palmar surfaces of the interphalangeal joints and the palms. A tabletop sign is positive in people with diabetes who are unable to lay their palms and the volar aspect of the fingers completely flat on a horizontal surface.

== Treatment ==
Diabetic cheiroarthropathy can be managed with pain relievers, anti-inflammatory medications, joint and muscle stretching exercises or occupational therapy, and better glucose monitoring and control.

== Epidemiology ==
Cheiroarthropathy has been reported in over 50% of insulin-dependent diabetic patients and approximately 75% of non insulin-dependent diabetes. Cheiroarthropathy occurs most often among patients with a longer history of diabetes and patients with a history of diabetic neuropathy.

== See also ==
- Diabetic dermadromes
- Necrobiosis lipoidica
- List of cutaneous conditions
