= Friction blister =

Skin condition that may occur at sites of combined pressure and friction

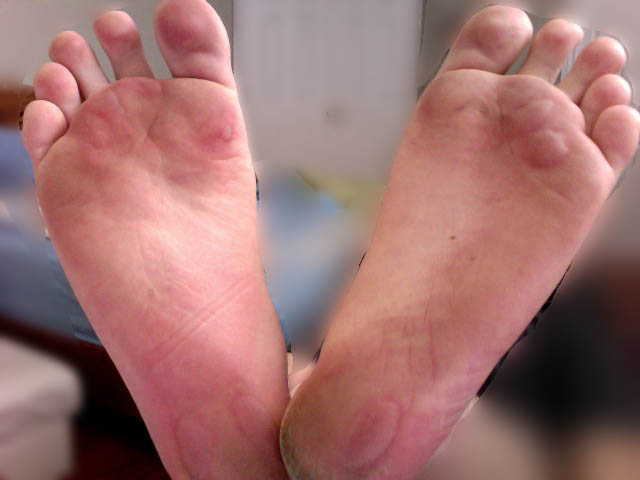
- Friction blisters on feet
- Specialty: Dermatology

Friction blisters are a skin condition that may occur at sites of combined pressure and friction (such as the hands or feet), and may be enhanced by heat, moisture, or cotton socks. Friction blisters are characterized by vesicles or bullae.

== See also ==
- Coma blister
- Skin lesion
