= Skin trauma =

Skin trauma is serious and altering physical injury experienced by the skin or multiple layers of epithelial tissues. This can be in the form of cuts, burns, sickness or other injury.
