= List of human leukocyte antigen alleles associated with cutaneous conditions =

There are many human leukocyte antigen (HLA) alleles associated with conditions of or affecting the human integumentary system

Human leukocyte antigen (HLA) alleles associated with conditions of or affecting the human integumentary system
Condition	Associated HLA allele(s)
Fixed drug eruption	B22
Lichen planus	DR1; DR2; DRw9; DR10; Bw15; B8
Psoriasis	Cw6; DR406
Psoriatic arthritis	B27
Ankylosing spondylitis	B27
Reactive arthritis	B27
Acute anterior uveitis	B27
Behçet's disease	B51
Dermatitis herpetiformis	DQw2; DR3; B8
Pemphigus vulgaris	DR4; DRw6; Dw10
Herpes gestationis	DR3; DR4
Epidermolysis bullosa acquisita	DR2
Subacute cutaneous lupus erythematosus	DR3
Dermatomyositis	DQA1; DR3; B8; DRw52
Alopecia areata	DR5
Sjögren's syndrome	DR3; DQ2
Herpes simplex virus-related erythema multiforme	B12
Chronic idiopathic urticaria	DR4; DQ8
Actinic prurigo	DR4 subtype DRB1*0407
Systemic lupus erythematosus	DR3; DR2
Generalized granuloma annulare	Bw35
Lichen sclerosus	DQ7
Early onset and severe psoriasis	B17

== See also ==
- List of allergens
- List of cutaneous conditions associated with increased risk of nonmelanoma skin cancer
- List of cutaneous conditions associated with internal malignancy
- List of cutaneous conditions caused by mutations in keratins
- List of cutaneous conditions caused by problems with junctional proteins
- List of dental abnormalities associated with cutaneous conditions
- List of genes mutated in cutaneous conditions
- List of histologic stains that aid in diagnosis of cutaneous conditions
- List of immunofluorescence findings for autoimmune bullous conditions
- List of inclusion bodies that aid in diagnosis of cutaneous conditions
- List of keratins expressed in the human integumentary system
- List of radiographic findings associated with cutaneous conditions
- List of skin conditions
- List of specialized glands within the human integumentary system
- List of target antigens in pemphigoid
- List of target antigens in pemphigus
