= Diabetic dermopathy =

Papillary skin disease resulting from diabetes

- Other names: Skin spots
- Specialty: Dermatology

Diabetic dermopathy is a type of skin lesion usually seen in people with diabetes mellitus. It is characterized by dull-red papules that progress to well-circumscribed, small, round, atrophic hyperpigmented skin lesions usually on the shins. It is the most common of several diabetic skin conditions, being found in up to 30% of diabetics. Similar lesions can occasionally be found in non-diabetics usually following trauma or injury to the area; however, more than 4 lesions strongly suggests diabetes.

== Cause ==
The cause is unknown but is thought to be associated with diabetic neuropathy and vascular complications; because the lesions are more common on the shins, some suggest it represents an altered response to injury. It is seen more commonly in patients with longstanding diabetes and poor glucose control.

== See also ==
- Eruptive xanthoma
- List of cutaneous conditions
- Diabetic dermadrome
