= Necrobiosis =

- Specialty: Pathology

Necrobiosis is the physiological death of a cell, and can be caused by conditions such as basophilia, erythema, or a tumor. It is identified both with and without necrosis.

Necrobiotic disorders are characterized by presence of necrobiotic granuloma on histopathology. Necrobiotic granuloma is described as aggregation of histiocytes around a central area of altered collagen and elastic fibers. Such a granuloma is typically arranged in a palisaded pattern.

It is associated with necrobiosis lipoidica and granuloma annulare.

Necrobiosis differs from apoptosis, which kills a damaged cell to protect the body from harm.

== Etymology ==
Necrobiosis stems from the Greek roots nekros, meaning “death” or “corpse”, and biosis, meaning “way of life” or “living”. The term is used in medical terminology to describe degenerative changes in connective tissues, although its specific meaning depends on the medical context in which it is used.

== Discovery ==
Originally coined in 1858 by the famous German pathologist and biologist Rudolf Karl Virchow, necrobiosis was first used to describe cell death that was not necrosis. Virchow discussed how “Necrobiosis is death brought on by (altered) life, a spontaneous wearing out of living parts… But the idea of necrosis really does not offer any analogy to these processes…”. Furthermore, necrosis is irreversible tissue damage and death of living cells, while necrobiosis is a very gradual and non-inflammatory deterioration of connective tissue, commonly collagen, which degrades into small fragments. Because this connective tissue is not necessarily vital to the cell’s life, necrobiosis does not automatically imply cell death. Despite Virchow’s original coining of the term, necrobiosis is described in many different ways by different authors.

== Causes ==
Necrobiosis can manifest in many different ways at the cellular level including collagen that is fragmented , compact/clumped , indistinct or homogenized, or have haphazard arrangement. Tissue experiencing necrobiosis can also exhibit decreased fibroblasts, reduced or absent nuclei, or diminished elastic fibers. Both collagen and elastic fibers are structural proteins in the extracellular matrix, so their degeneration affects the structure of the affected tissue.

While the actual cause of necrobiosis is unknown, there are multiple theories as to what prompts it. Some scientists believe it stems from the thickening of small vessels, or microangiopathy, which restricts blood flow and nutrient delivery to the affected area of tissue. This can result in a limited ability to repair and maintain the tissue. Another leading theory is that immune responses trigger reactions that indirectly damage dermal collagen. Using immunofluorescence microscopy, immunoglobulin M, IgA, the third component of complement (C3), and fibrinogen have been shown to be present in blood vessels of tissue affected by necrobiosis lipoidica. The presence of these molecules does support the idea that immune complexes could contribute to the symptoms of necrobiosis; their presence does not prove that these molecules cause vascular thickening.

== Associated Conditions ==
Two of the most common conditions associated with necrobiosis are necrobiosis lipoidica and granuloma annulare. Necrobiosis lipoidica is a chronic, idiopathic disease that manifests as skin lesions. Necrobiosis lipoidica is typically found on the anterior surface of the shin. Diabetes mellitus, specifically type one, is commonly associated with necrobiosis lipoidica, but while a very significant percentage of people with necrobiosis lipoidica are also affected by type one diabetes mellitus, a very small percentage of people with type one diabetes mellitus are affected by necrobiosis lipoidica. This suggests that vascular disturbances that can be caused by diabetes mellitus cause the collagen disruption in necrobiosis lipoidica. Additionally, research has shown that thyroid disease has a higher-than-expected correlation with necrobiosis lipoidica.

Like necrobiosis lipoidica, Granuloma annulare is a chronic, idiopathic condition. Unlike necrobiosis lipoidica, granuloma annulare manifests as small papules, ranging from skin-toned to erythematous, in a circular formation. Granuloma annulare is most commonly found on the dorsal surface of the hands and feet. Granuloma annulare has been seen to follow trauma, viral infections, insect bites, and tuberculosis skin tests. Similar to necrobiosis lipoidica, granuloma annulare is associated with diabetes mellitus, with twelve percent of people experiencing granuloma annulare having diabetes mellitus.

== Treatment ==
There are many different treatment options for necrobiosis-related conditions with no uniform treatment guidelines. The most commonly used treatment options are topical glucocorticosteroids. These steroids have been shown to have a positive effect on necrobiosis-related conditions in 40% of cases. These glucocorticosteroids work by slowing down the production of the molecules that cause inflammation. Although they have been shown to improve necrobiosis symptoms, they have been shown to also cause skin atrophy, and are not advised to be used on atrophic lesions.

Another common treatment option is calcineurin inhibitors, specifically tacrolimus, an immunosuppressant medication. Tacrolimus is typically used when the area affected by necrobiosis also is affected by atrophic lesions, so glucocorticosteroids should not be used. Tacrolimus has been shown to be more effective than glucocorticosteroids, even showing positive effects in 61.5% of cases. Tacrolimus works by inhibiting calcineurin, a calcium-dependent enzyme that controls cell signaling. Inhibiting calcineurin ultimately slows the production of Interleukin-2 proteins, which stimulates T cell growth. Limited T cell production limits the immune response, which is commonly associated with inflammation.

Janus kinase (JAK) inhibitors are a promising new treatment option. While the mechanism of how JAK inhibitors treat necrobiosis-based conditions has not been fully proven, it has been shown that JAK inhibitors inhibit the JAK-STAT pathway, which some cells use to activate signaling due to the lack of intrinsic kinase activity. The inhibition of this pathway using JAK inhibitors affects the gene expression of many different inflammatory cytokines and enzymes.

Photodynamic therapy is a new treatment option for necrobiosis lipoidica. Photodynamic therapy works by combining a light-sensitive drug called a photosensitizer with specific wavelengths of light. The light causes the production of toxic oxygen molecules in the targeted cells, damaging the cells’ mitochondrial membranes and causing cell death. In a study between 2013 and 2023, 59% of patients showed at least partial clearance over the course of the study.
