= Onychorrhexis =

Ridges or splits in the fingernail or toenail

- Other names: Brittle nails
- Specialty: Dermatology

Onychorrhexis (from the Greek words ὄνυχο- ónycho-, "nail" and ῥῆξις rhexis, "bursting"), is a brittleness with breakage of finger or toenails that may result from hypothyroidism, anemia, anorexia nervosa or bulimia, or after oral retinoid therapy. It can also be seen in melanoma that involves the nail and onychomycosis.

Onychorrhexis affects up to 20% of the population.

== See also ==
- Nail anatomy
- List of cutaneous conditions
