= Collagen loss =

Decrease of collagen levels in the human body

collagen loss
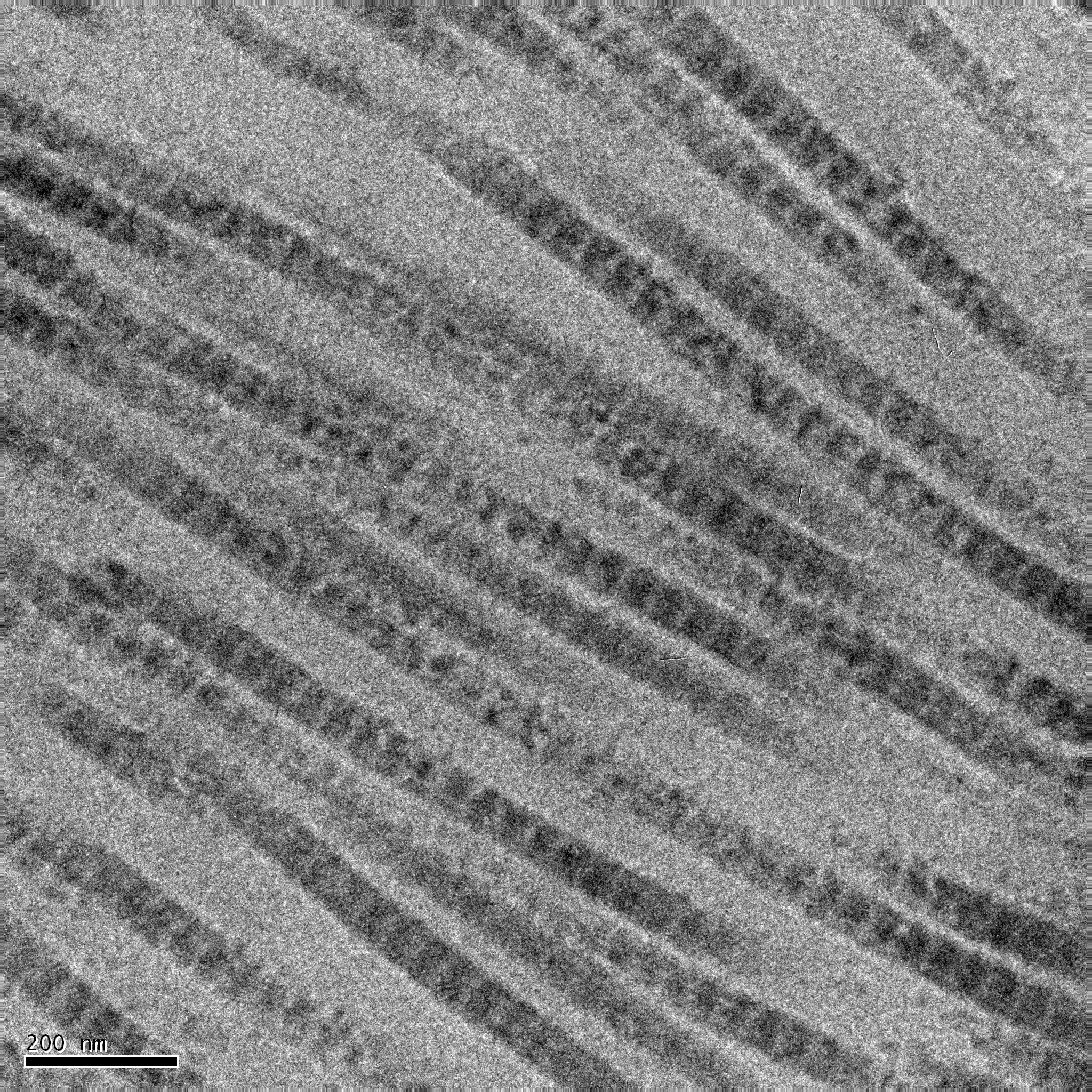
- The D-period of collagen fibrils results in visible 67nm bands when observed by electron microscopy.
- Biological system: Systemic
- Health: Collagen loss can contribute to skin aging, joint pain, weakened hair and nails, reduced bone density, gastrointestinal issues, and reduced muscle mass.
- Action: Involuntary
- Frequency: Lifetime

Collagen loss is the gradual decrease of levels of collagen in the body. Collagen is the main structural protein found in the body's various connective tissues (skin, bones, tendons, etc.) where it contributes to much of their strength and elasticity.

Collagen loss occurs naturally as a part of aging, but can also be influenced by environmental factors such as exposure to ultraviolet light, tobacco, and excessive intake of sugar. Collagen loss is highly visible in the skin where it can cause the skin to lose elasticity, reduction of the thickness of the epidermis, an increase in the formation of wrinkles and sagging and also make the skin vulnerable and easily damaged.

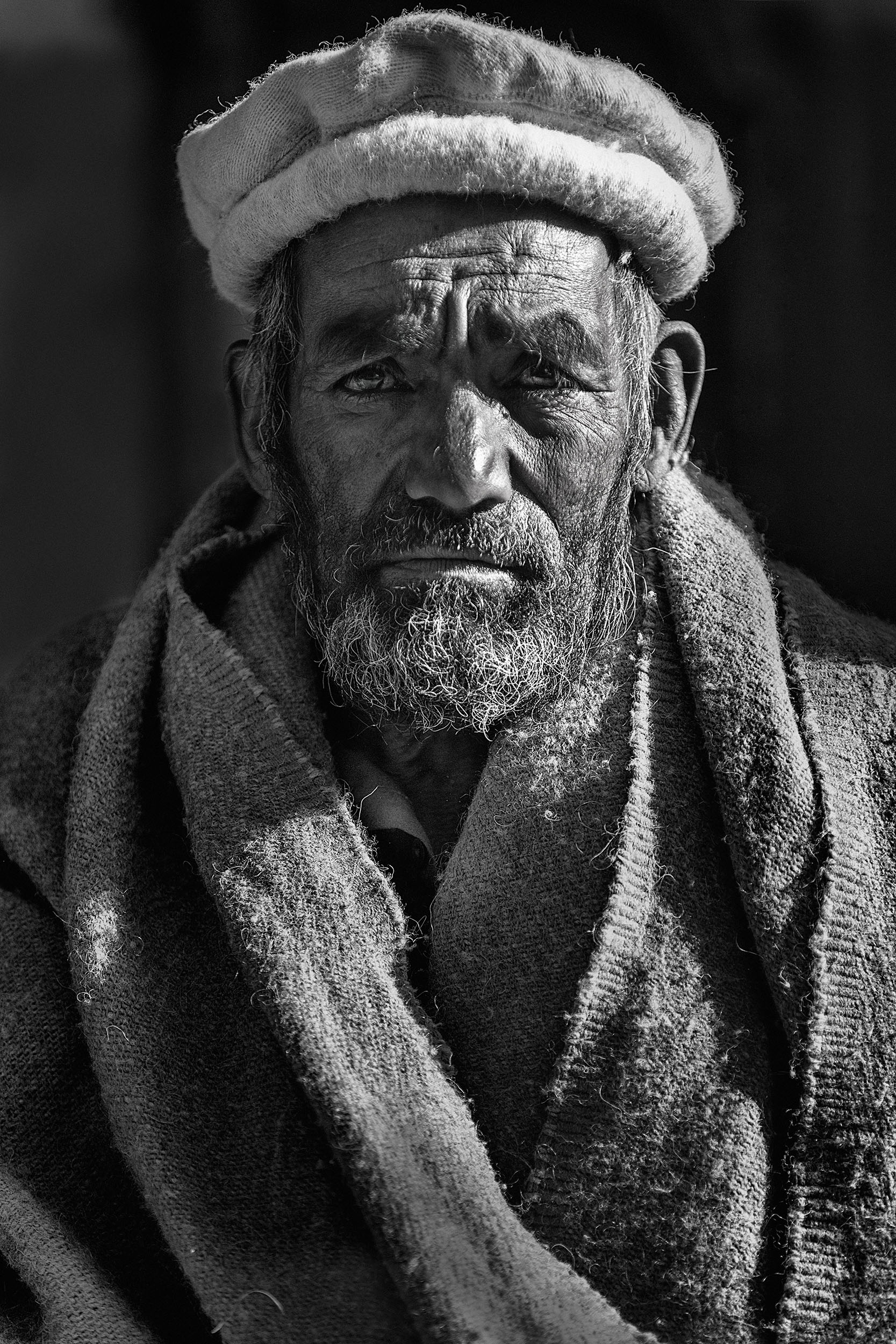
Aging skin is characterized by wrinkles, loss of skin flexibility, laxity, and having a rough appearance in the skin texture.

Prevalent throughout the body, loss of collagen can also contribute to numerous other disorders such as joint pain, weakened hair and nails, reduced bone density, gastrointestinal issues, and reduced muscle mass. Numerous interventions exist to address the loss of collagen with varying levels of efficacy and evidentiary support.

== Collagen ==
Collagen is the main structural protein in the extracellular matrix found in the body's various connective tissues. It is a rigid, non-soluble, fibrous protein that adds up to one-third of the proteins in the human body. Collagen is mostly made up of molecules packed together to form long and thin fibrils that support each other and ensure the skin is strong and elastic. Various types of collagens have individual roles and structures. Most collagen belongs to types 1, 2, and 3. Collagen consists mainly of amino acids and can be mostly found in tendons, muscles, bones, skin, ligaments, and other fibrous tissues. It helps keep the skin strong and supple and sustains the renewal of skin cells and the replacement of damaged and dead body cells. Collagen tissues provide support for the formation of bones, tendons, and cartilage, which depends on their level of mineralization.

== Molecular mechanisms in skin aging ==
Many dissimilar models have been used to explain skin aging on a molecular basis, such as the theory of cellular senescence, the reduction of the cells' DNA repair capacity, the loss of telomeres, oxidative stress, etc. It is believed that external factors cause a large portion of skin aging, while only 3% is caused by hereditary genetic influences. The following sections discuss prominent models and advancements in molecular mechanism studies related to skin aging.

=== Oxidative stress ===
Oxidative stress results from the lack of balance between the systemic production of reactive oxygen species (ROS) and the biological system's capacity to detoxify them or repair the resulting damage. It is known that reactive oxygen species take part in dermal changes taking place outside the cells in both aging caused by internal factors and those caused by external factors. ROS can be created within many dissimilar sources, which include the mitochondria, endoplasmic reticulum and peroxisomes. In normal conditions the binding of ligands to receptor tyrosine kinases (RTKs) activates them, while the various actions of RTKs on the cells' surface are repressed by receptor protein tyrosine phosphatases.

=== DNA damage ===
Exposure to ultraviolet rays damages DNA, which may disrupt the function of the genes that play a role in the skin stem cells' homeostasis. Mutations in DNA from frequent exposure to UV radiation may result in aging prematurely or carcinogenesis. When DNA absorbs photons in the UV-B range the nucleotide arrangement structurally changes which leads to the DNA strands having defects. In the lesser species, they can repair the damage to the DNA using the photolyase enzyme, but higher species do not have this enzyme. In human cells, repair can be achieved through the nucleotide excision repair pathway; when the associated proteins are deficient, the skin becomes susceptible to premature aging.

=== Telomere shortening ===
Telomeres are nucleoid sequences that repeat themselves and cap chromosomes. They protect chromosomes from dilapidation and recombination abnormalities. Their length decreases with every division of the cell and results in cellular senescence. They are critical structures at the end of the eukaryotic chromosomes, consisting of many copies of G rich repeats. Without telomeres, chromosomes will combine and cause instability in the genes. The enzyme that increases telomere length to prevent them from becoming short is called telomerase. Deficiency of this enzyme can hasten telomere shortening which can cause a flawed regeneration of the tissue. This also suppresses the production of epidermal cells. Also, exposure to UV radiation causes mutations to telomeres and sufficient exposure can result in the deaths of cells.

=== "Inflammaging" ===
"Inflammaging" refers a chronic, sterile, low-grade inflammation that develops with advanced age. It affects the start and progression of diseases that occur due to aging, e.g. type 2 diabetes. It occurs in the skin because when exposed to UV radiation, it damages the epidermal cells, which in turn causes inflammation to occur.

=== Increase in age ===
When an individual ages, the outermost layer of skin becomes thin despite the number of cell layers remaining unchanged. The number of cells that contain pigment decreases, and the melanocytes that remain increase in size. This is why aging skin looks thin, pale, and translucent. Large spots may be pigmented when some areas are exposed to sunlight. The various alterations in the skin and underlying connective tissue may decrease its strength and elasticity. Also, the blood vessels in the outer skin become more delicate and can result in bruises and bleeding under the skin's surface. The subcutaneous glands also excrete decreased amounts of oil as you age. Men experience this shortage mostly after reaching the age of 80 years. Women may slowly begin excreting less oil after menopause, making it difficult to keep the skin moist. The subcutaneous fat layer also decreases, reducing the insulation and padding capability of the skin. This can put the individual at risk of an injury and makes maintaining body temperature difficult. The sweat glands also reduce the amount of sweat they produce, making the individual's body harder to cool.

== Lifestyle habits ==
=== Excessive sugar intake ===
Too much sugar intake can negatively impact the body, including damage to collagen. Excess sugar consumption results in glycation that produces AGEs. This occurs naturally, and when too much sugar is consumed, the AGE molecules stick to the collagen molecules turning them stiff, thus damaging them. The process of glycation does not only damage the collagen existing in the body but also makes some alterations to its stability. When an individual consumes excessive amounts of sugar, the glycation process converts collagen into an unstable type 1, which becomes more vulnerable and can be easily broken down, potentially leading to premature aging.

=== Tobacco usage ===
The use of tobacco can cause damage to the skin's collagen layer. It can cause the skin around the lips to lose collagen when in contact with the smoke or due to puckering of the lips around the cigarette. It may also cause blood vessels to constrict and reduce blood flow. Due to this, perioral collagen (connective tissue around the mouth below the skin) may show signs of damage. When collagen is lost in large amounts, it may cause wrinkles to emerge. Tobacco use can also result in slow collagen healing.

== Treatment for collagen loss ==
Some of the causatives that break down collagen include spending too much time in the sun, smoking, dehydration, and stress. Thus, loss of collagen can be prevented via dietary changes, which may increase the turnover of cells and increase the creation of collagen, as well as lifestyle changes, including applying an adequate amount of sunscreen to prevent UV rays from the sun from damaging the skin and partaking in stress-relieving activities.

Other interventions, such as taking vitamins C and A, can provide a boost to collagen production in the body. Consuming nutritious foods rich in the necessary vitamins, minerals, and amino acids promotes collagen production and reduces cellular damage within the body.
