= Autoimmune estrogen dermatitis =

- Specialty: Dermatology

Autoimmune estrogen dermatitis presents as a cyclic skin disorder, that may appear eczematous, papular, bullous, or urticarial. with pruritus typically present, skin eruptions that may be chronic but which are exacerbated premenstrually or occur immediately following menses.

== See also ==
- Skin lesion
