= Fixed drug reaction =

- Other names: Drug eruption
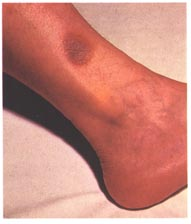
- Fixed drug eruption caused by phenolphthalein
- Specialty: Dermatology

Fixed drug reactions are common and so named because they recur at the same site with each exposure to a particular medication. Medications inducing fixed drug eruptions are usually those taken intermittently.

== Signs and symptoms ==
A painful and itchy reddish/purple patch of skin that occurs in the same location with repeated exposures to the causative drug is the classic presentation of a fixed drug reaction. The lips, genitals, and hands are often involved.

== Cause ==
Medications that are commonly implicated as a cause of fixed drug eruptions include the following:

- Cetirizine
- Ciprofloxacin
- Clarithromycin
- Cotrimoxazole
- Doxycycline
- Fluconazole
- NSAIDs (e.g., ibuprofen, etoricoxib, naproxen)
- Phenytoin
- Pseudoephedrine
- Trimethoprim

== See also ==
- Drug eruption
- List of cutaneous conditions
- List of human leukocyte antigen alleles associated with cutaneous conditions
- Stevens–Johnson syndrome
