= Diabetic bulla =

Noninflammatory, spontaneous, painless blister, associated with diabetes

- Other names: Bullosis diabeticorum and bullous eruption of diabetes mellitus
- Specialty: Dermatology

A diabetic bulla, also known as bullosis diabeticorum, or bullous eruption of diabetes mellitus, is a cutaneous condition characterized by a noninflammatory, spontaneous, painless blister, often in acral locations (peripheral body parts, such as feet, toes, hands, fingers, ears or nose), seen in diabetic patients.

== See also ==
- Diabetic dermadromes
- Skin lesion
