= Necrobiosis lipoidica =

- Other names: Necrobiosis lipoidica diabeticorum
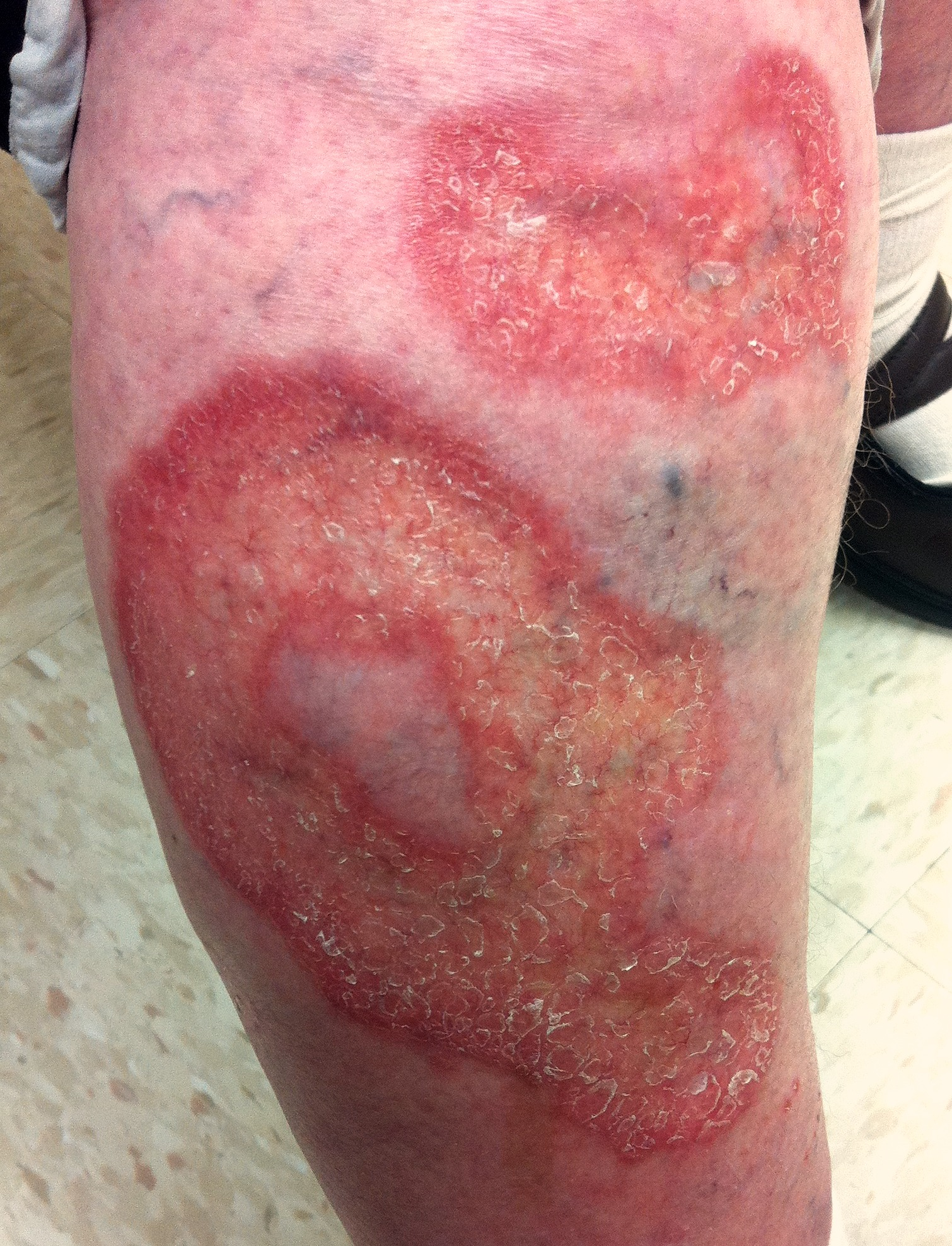
- Specialty: Dermatology

Necrobiosis Lipoidica is a rare, chronic skin condition predominantly associated with diabetes mellitus (known as necrobiosis lipoidica diabeticorum or NLD). It can occur in individuals with rheumatoid arthritis or without any underlying conditions (idiopathic). It can also occur in patients with obesity, hypertension, celiac disease, and metabolic syndrome. Approximately a quarter of Necrobiosis Lipoidica cases are associated with diabetes mellitus.

The broader overarching definition of necrobiosis is a gradual physiological death of a cell. It can be caused by basophilia, erythema, or a tumor. As a dermapathology term, it refers to altered collagen or altered dermal connective tissue. Necrobiosis Lipoidica is linked to microvascular damage and collagen degeneration. The exact cause of this condition is not known. It involves collagen degeneration and a granulomatous response in the layer of the skin called the dermis, often affecting the deeper fat layer and thickening dermal blood vessels.

It is characterized by hardened, raised areas of the skin, often appearing on the shins, with a yellowish center and a surrounding dark pink area. The lesions are generally asymptomatic but can become tender and ulcerate when injured. Histological features and skin changes are caused by thickening of the blood vessel wall, collagen deterioration, granuloma (clustered white blood cells in tissues) formation, and fat deposits. Necrobiosis Lipoidica has many possible contributing factors, and research for treatment and causes is an ongoing process.

== Epidemiology ==
Necrobiosis Lipoidica is known to have a strong correlation with diabetes mellitus. It occurs after the diagnosis of diabetes mellitus in 64% of cases. However, there is no conclusive association between the two. NL may present itself in a completely healthy individual. It is also found in people with other metabolic diseases, thyroid disorders, and inflammatory diseases. It occurs predominantly in females, in a 3:1 ratio compared to males. Onset of NL typically occurs at ages 30-50 but is not exclusively linked to this range. A few studies have found that ulceration is most common in male patients with diabetes mellitus.

== Etiology and pathogenesis ==
=== Diabetic microangiopathy ===
It affects approximately 0.3%- 1.2% of diabetics, showing a higher prevalence in women. There are many factors involved in Necrobiosis Lipoidica. A common theory for why it is associated with diabetes is a result of vascular disturbance involving immune complex deposition that leads to collagen degeneration. The core pathologies of diabetes include thickening of the basement membrane, loss of pericytes, endothelial dysfunction and capillary occlusion. Since NL is more common in patients with diabetes, there is a suggested link with the microvascular damage associated with diabetes, where the small blood vessels in the skin are impacted.

=== Immunoglobulins, complement and fibrinogen ===
Immunoglobulins (IgM, IgA), complement (C3), and fibrinogen have been found in blood vessel walls of patients with NL. Both Immunoglobulin and C3 are known to play a significant role in the immune response. Fibrinogen is a protein that plays a crucial role in blood clotting (often found at the dermal-epidermal junction). These deposits cause vascular thickening, which is a hallmark of NL.

=== Abnormal collagen ===
Abnormal collagen fibrils are often found in diabetes. Due to increased levels of lysyl oxidase, collagen increases cross-linking. This thickens the basement membrane, another hallmark of NL.

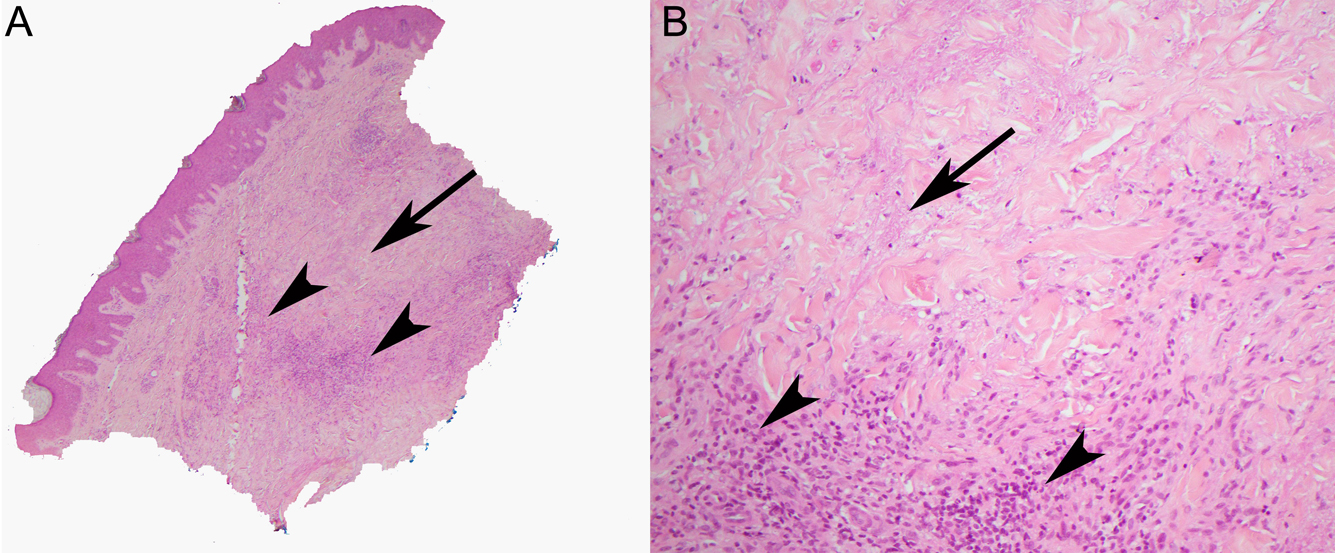
In the dermis, there is degenerate (so-called 'necrobiotic') collagen (arrows) bordered by an irregular inflammatory infiltrate (arrowheads) composed of histocytes, lymphocytes, and occasional plasma cells. These morphological features including the irregularity of the contours, are quite typical for necrobiosis lipoidica

=== Impaired neutrophil migration and tumor necrosis factor- Alpha ===
Impaired neutrophil migration (caused by genetic defects, infections, and the aging process) causes increased macrophage activity that can lead to granuloma formation, a hallmark of NL. Furthermore, TNF-α is a pro-inflammatory cytokine that's activated by macrophages, and it plays a critical role in granuloma formation.

== Cell biology of Necrobiosis lipoidica ==
=== Examining what occurs at the cellular level of NL. ===
Tissue Architecture in NL Lesions

A lesion is a tissue that has been altered or injured. They can occur as wounds or, in the case of progressive NL, ulcers.

The tissue architecture of NL is characterized by degeneration of collagen in the dermis and subcutaneous layers. The lesions exhibit granulomatous inflammation, palisading granulomas, and thickened blood vessels. Palisading granulomas are significant because they show an immune cell ring around degenerated tissue, commonly seen in autoimmune and chronic inflammatory diseases. Thickened blood vessels occur due to an accumulation of immune cells. Together, all these structural features indicate NL as a chronic, inflammatory response. Fibroblasts and endothelial cells are malfunctioning, and there is an imbalance in tissue homeostasis.

Fibroblast and collagen remodeling

Fibroblasts contribute to the formation of connective tissue, collagen, and elastin. Failure in fibroblasts causes skin to atrophy and degenerate.

Increased uptake of GLUT-1 (a glucose transporter) is observed in NL cases. When up-regulated: glycolysis, oxidative stress, and fibroblast proliferation all increase. Despite the metabolic increase, fibroblasts in NL dysfunction. This suggests that in NL tissue decay and dysfunction are linked to both structural and immunological tissue components. The tissue is observed to have increased GLUT-1 and decreased pro-collagen mRNA.

A predominance of Type 1 collagen is observed in PL. Type 1 is associated with early phase wound healing compared to Type 3 collagen seen in normal, healthy tissues.

=== Vascular endothelium and microangiopathy ===
An upregulation of vascular cell adhesion molecule-1 is observed in NL tissue, indicating leukocyte aggregation and an inflammatory response. Furthermore, there is a reduced VEGF expression along with AGE-mediated cross-linking, reducing ECM fluidity. Both factors impair new vessel growth, lead to poor oxygenation, and impair tissue healing.

=== Immune cells and inflammatory signaling ===
Macrophages present in the lesion environment differentiate into Multinucleated Giant Cells after prolonged activation. Secreted matrix metalloproteinases degrade collagen and fuel necrobiosis in response to immune activation. T cells, prominent in NL (Th-1 type cytokines) inhibit healing by the production of IFN-γ, suppressing M2 repair. These factors suggest a link to autoimmune conditions, as these factors explain a pro-inflammatory feedback loop.

=== Epidermal barrier ===
Necrobiosis, mainly affecting dermis and subcutaneous tissue, can also impact the epidermis. TNF-α and IFN-γ impair keratinocyte function, inhibiting keratinocyte proliferation and migration, two processes essential for reepithelialization and wound closure. Chronic keratinocyte dysfunction can lead to tissue atrophy. Furthermore, inflammatory signaling may downregulate key cell-cell adhesion molecules such as E-cadherin and β-catenin, compromising epidermal tight junctions and leading to skin barrier dysfunction. All of these factors impact the epidermal integrity and barrier.

=== Oxidative stress ===
Oxidative stress causes the accumulation of reactive oxygen species (ROS), resulting in oxidative damage to DNA, proteins involved in cellular repair, and lipids that support the skin barrier. Oxidative stress can hinder the fibroblasts' collagen production, endothelial cell angiogenesis, and keratinocytes' re-epithelialization. The result of oxidative stress is a state of cellular senescence, where cells secrete pro-inflammatory factors and are unable to divide. Senescent cells signal to immune cells, perpetuating a non-resolving wound that can develop into an ulcer.

=== Diabetes-related modifiers of cellular function ===
Necrobiosis Lipoidica commonly co-occurs with Type 1 diabetes. The metabolic dysregulation found in diabetes has a profound impact on cellular function. Diabetes is known to alter the expression of miRNAs and promote oxidative stress. Prolonged high blood sugar can increase oxidative stress, disrupt nitric oxide production, essential for vasodilation and vessel formation.

Hyperglycemia also leads to the accumulation of advanced glycation end-products (AGEs), which activate the RAGE–NF-κB axis, leading to inflammation and endothelial apoptosis. Structural changes occur, including basement membrane thickening and extracellular matrix stiffening.

== Signs and symptoms ==
NL/NLD most frequently appears on the patient's shins, often on both legs, although it may also occur on forearms, hands, trunk, and, rarely, nipple, penis, and surgical sites. The lesions are often asymptomatic, but may become tender and ulcerate when injured. The first symptom of NL is often a "bruised" appearance (erythema) that is not necessarily associated with a known injury. The extent to which NL is inherited is unknown.

NLD appears as a hardened, raised area of the skin. The center of the affected area usually has a yellowish tint, while the area surrounding it is a dark pink. The affected area can spread or turn into an open sore. When this happens, the patient is at greater risk of developing ulcers. If an injury to the skin occurs on the affected area, it may not heal properly, or it will leave a dark scar.

== Histopathology ==
Although the exact cause of this condition is not known, it is an inflammatory disorder characterized by collagen degeneration, combined with a granulomatous response. It always involves the dermis diffusely, and sometimes also involves the deeper fat layer. Commonly, dermal blood vessels are thickened (Microangiopathy).

It can be precipitated by local trauma, though it often occurs without any injury.

As a metabolically driven skin disorder, the pathology is characterized by poor intracellular glucose utilization leading to metabolically stressed fibroblasts. Despite an increased GLUT-1 response, fibroblasts in NL fail to produce normal collagen, weakening and breaking down the skin's structure. Vascular impairments reduce oxygen and nutrient circulation, creating hypoxia and tissue breakdown.

== Diagnosis ==
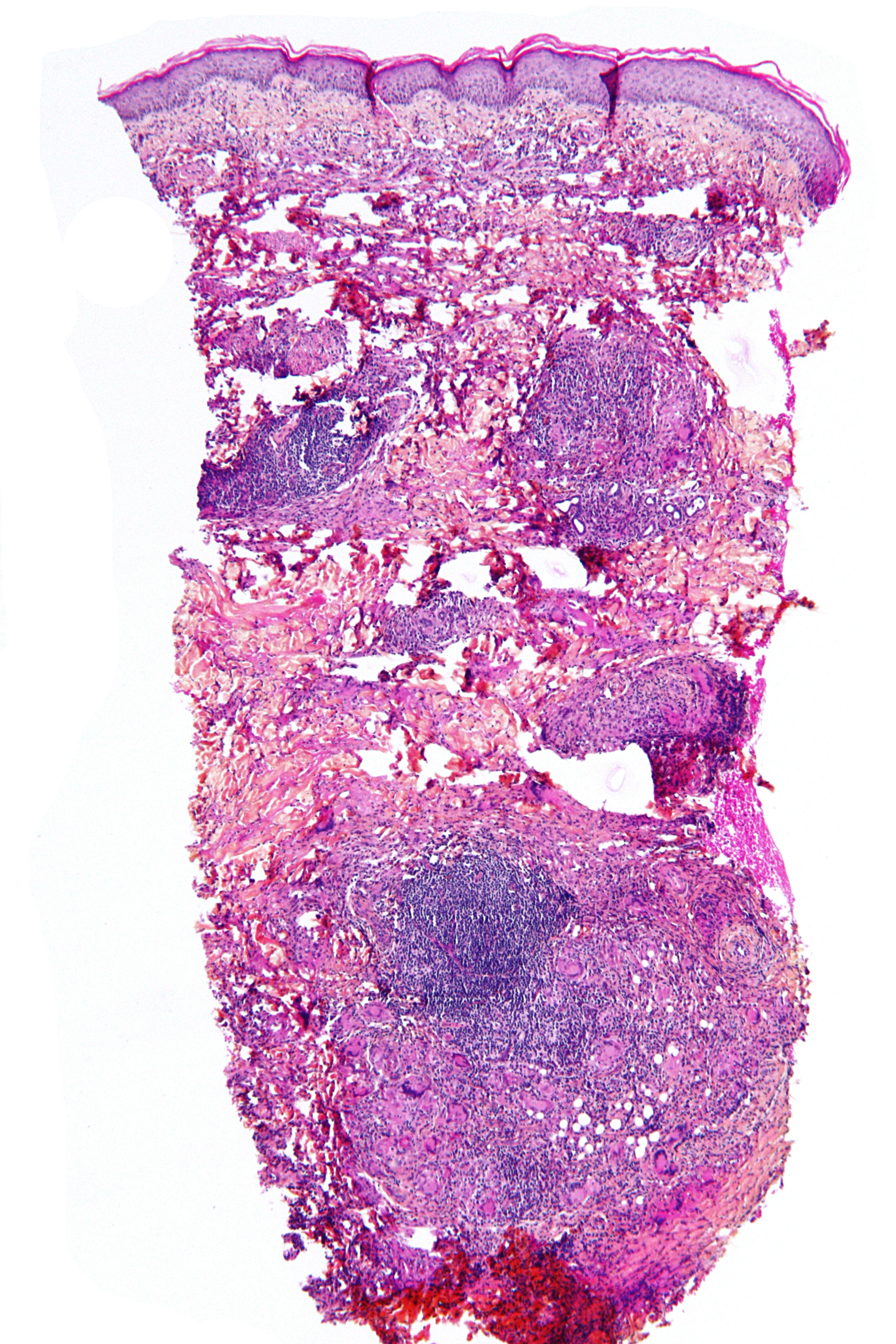
Micrograph showing necrobiosis lipoidica in a punch biopsy

NL is diagnosed by a skin biopsy, demonstrating superficial and deep perivascular and interstitial mixed inflammatory cell infiltrate (including lymphocytes, plasma cells, mononucleated and multinucleated histocytes, and eosinophils) in the dermis and subcutis, as well as necrotising vasculitis with adjacent necrobiosis and necrosis of adnexal structures. Areas of necrobiosis are often more extensive and less well defined than in granuloma annulare. The presence of lipid in necrobiotic areas may be demonstrated by Sudan stains. Cholesterol clefts, fibrin, and mucin may also be present in areas of necrobiosis. Depending on the severity of the necrobiosis, certain cell types may be more predominant. When a lesion is in its early stages, neutrophils may be present, whereas in later stages of development, lymphocytes and histiocytes may be predominant.

== Treatment ==
There is no clearly defined cure for necrobiosis. NLD may be treated with PUVA therapyPhotodynamic therapy and improved therapeutic control.

Although some techniques can be used to diminish the signs of necrobiosis, such as low-dose aspirin orally, a steroid cream or injection into the affected area, this process may be effective for only a small percentage of those treated.

First medications applied are topical corticosteroids, but these may not be effective for all patients. Compression therapy and proper wound care are essential for treatment.

Anti-inflammatory, immunosuppressive, and immunomodulatory agents like chloroquine, dapsone, and oral calcineurin inhibitors. These target the cyclic and damaging immune response occurring in NL.

Since TNF is essential to granuloma formation, antibodies that bind to TNF-α to prevent its action help reduce inflammation, pain, and the growth of ulcers. A study found a 70% complete reduction of NL when using TNF-α inhibitors.

Hyperbaric oxygen can also be used to increase the amount of oxygen circulation and promote wound healing.

== Prognosis ==
Necrobiosis Lipoidica is classically chronic, difficult to manage, and treat. The prognosis is not reassuring. Squamous cell carcinoma is often a concern with NL. However, this occurs very late into the diagnosis

Treatment can typically stop the growth of lesions and ulcers. Lesion treatment is often exquisitely painful and requires intensive wound care. Aesthetically, wounds rarely heal without scarring.

== See also ==
- Diabetic dermadromes
- List of cutaneous conditions
