= Tuberculoid leprosy =

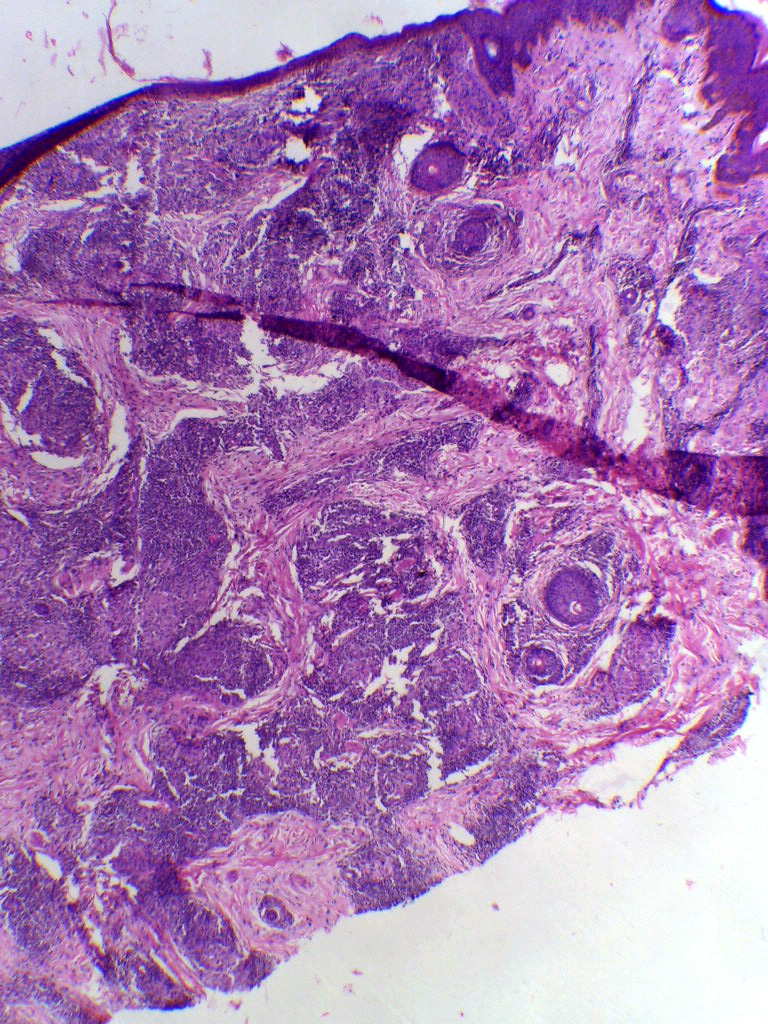
- Skin biopsy in tuberculoid leprosy showing multiple peri-appendageal granulomas.
- Specialty: Infectious diseases

Tuberculoid leprosy is a form of leprosy characterized by solitary skin lesions that are asymmetrically distributed with few lesions and well demarcated edges. There is also early and marked nerve damage. It tends to heal spontaneously. Tuberculoid leprosy is characterized by the formation of epithelioid cell granulomas consisting of a large number of epithelioid cells. In this form of leprosy, Mycobacterium leprae are either absent from the lesion or occur in very small numbers. This type of leprosy is the most benign and the least contagious.

== See also ==
- Leprosy
- Skin lesion
