= Malum perforans =

- Other names: Neurotrophic ulcer and Trophic ulcer
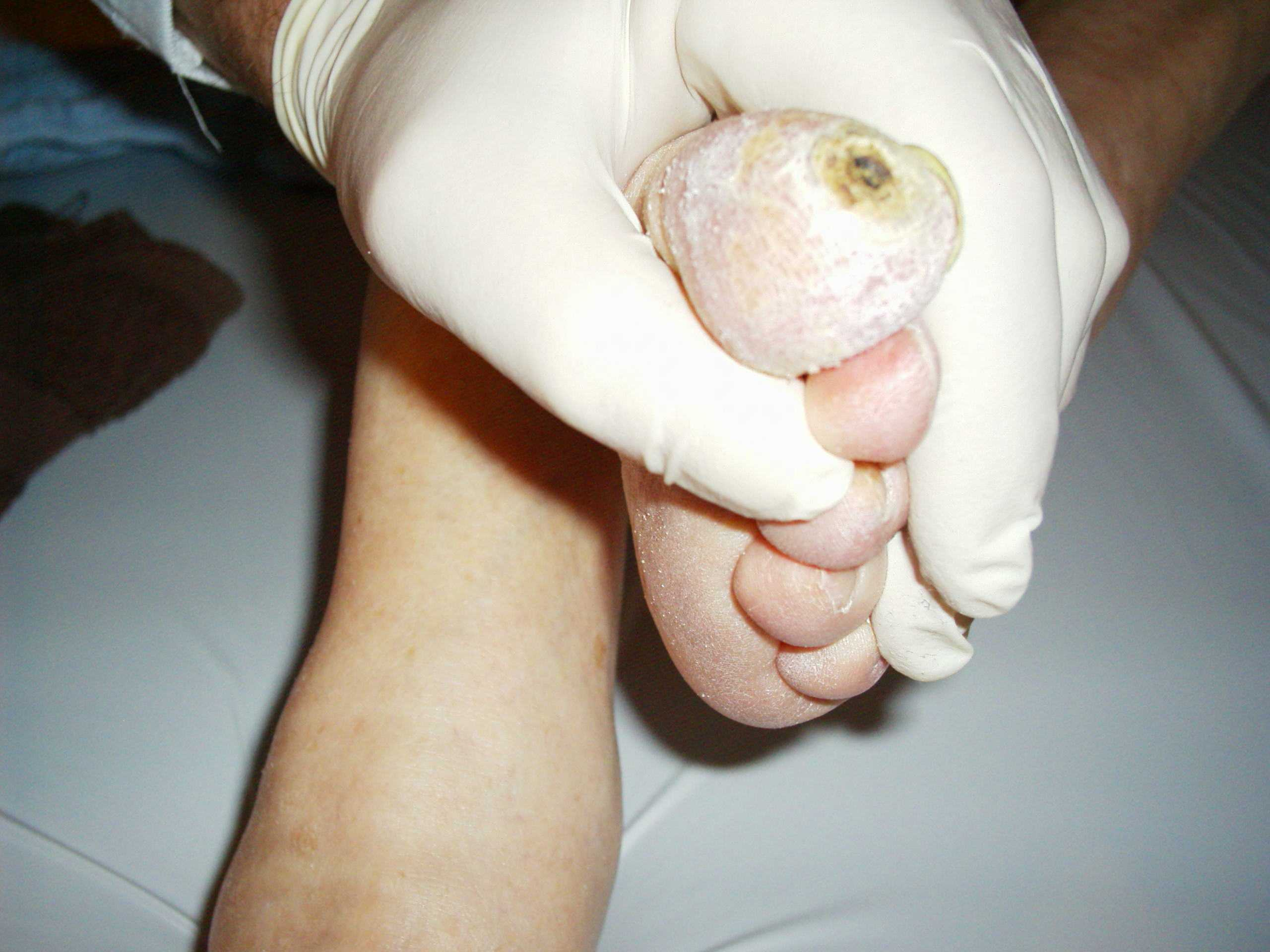
- Diabetic foot ulcer
- Specialty: Dermatology

Malum perforans is a long-lasting, usually painless ulcer that penetrates deep into or through the skin, usually on the sole of the foot (in which case it may be called malum perforans pedis). It is often a complication in diabetes mellitus and other conditions affecting the nerves.

== Presentation ==
A 47-year-old diabetic patient with profound peripheral neuropathy developed a blister on the plantar aspect of her right heel that became recalcitrant to conservative treatment.

These ulcers have punched-out edge and slough in floor, resembling gummatous ulcer. Surrounding area might have loss of sensation This is due to the fact that the nerves are no longer working properly.

== Cause ==
This condition results from denervation of areas exposed to day-to-day friction of bony prominences. The denervation may be result of any of the following diseases:

- Spinal injuries
- Leprosy
- Peripheral nerve injury
- Diabetic neuropathy
- Tabes dorsalis
- Transverse myelitis
- Meningomyelocele
- Syringomyelia

== Pathophysiology ==
Normal pressure and pain sensations are essential for protecting the foot from excessive and prolonged pressures over bony prominences. In insensitive foot, such as in diabetic neuropathy, soft tissues are exposed to excessive pressures without knowledge of the individual. In other words, by nerve damage in the feet, the patients get no feedback on the impact of the feet when walking. These ulcers start with callosity under which suppuration takes place. The pus comes out and a hole forms under which the lesion grows deeper. This leads to punched-out, painless ulcers usually under metatarsal heads, tip of toe, or proximal interphalangeal joint of a hammertoe or on the heel. In non-ambulatory patients, these ulcers are found on buttocks and back of the heel.

== Diagnosis ==
Diagnosis is clinical. Sensation is tested using graded monofilament.

== Treatment ==
The underlying cause of the neuropathy is first treated. Necrotic portions of the wound are removed and the wound is kept moist at all occasions. Infected ulcers are administered antibiotics.

Skin grafting is one option. It has been shown that ultrasound may increase the acceptance of a graft at trophic ulcer sites.

== See also ==
- List of cutaneous conditions
