= List of skin conditions =

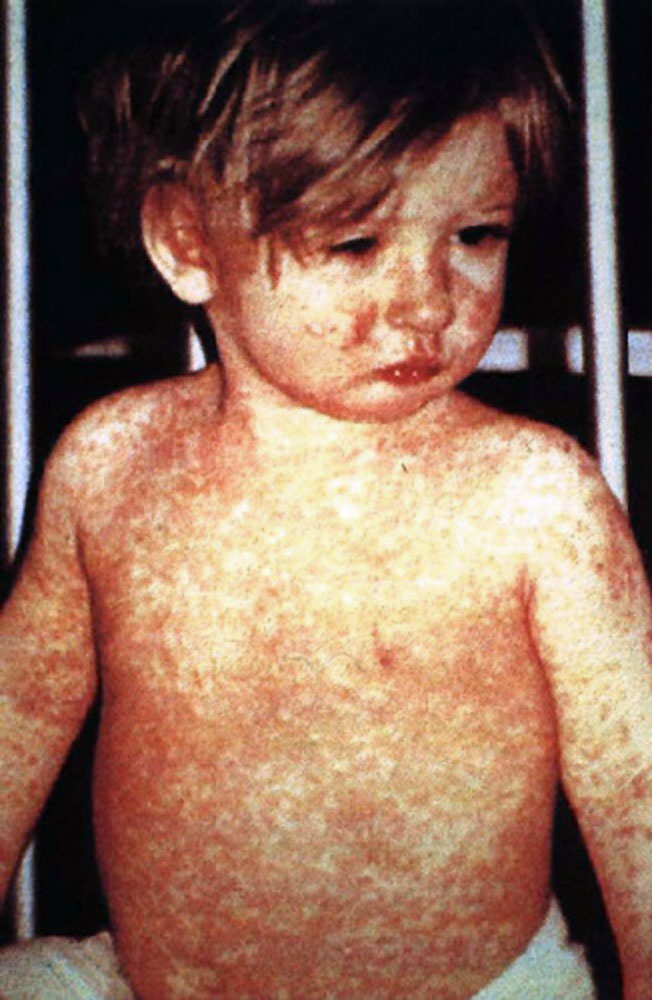
Rash due to measles

Many skin conditions affect the human integumentary system—the organ system covering the entire surface of the body and composed of skin, hair, nails, and related muscles and glands. The major function of this system is as a barrier against the external environment. The skin weighs an average of four kilograms, covers an area of two square metres, and is made of three distinct layers: the epidermis, dermis, and subcutaneous tissue. The two main types of human skin are: glabrous skin, the hairless skin on the palms and soles (also referred to as the "palmoplantar" surfaces), and hair-bearing skin. Within the latter type, the hairs occur in structures called pilosebaceous units, each with hair follicle, sebaceous gland, and associated arrector pili muscle. In the embryo, the epidermis, hair, and glands form from the ectoderm, which is chemically influenced by the underlying mesoderm that forms the dermis and subcutaneous tissues.

The epidermis is the most superficial layer of skin, a squamous epithelium with several strata: the stratum corneum, stratum lucidum, stratum granulosum, stratum spinosum, and stratum basale. Nourishment is provided to these layers by diffusion from the dermis since the epidermis is without direct blood supply. The epidermis contains four cell types: keratinocytes, melanocytes, Langerhans cells, and Merkel cells. Of these, keratinocytes are the major component, constituting roughly 95 percent of the epidermis. This stratified squamous epithelium is maintained by cell division within the stratum basale, in which differentiating cells slowly displace outwards through the stratum spinosum to the stratum corneum, where cells are continually shed from the surface. In normal skin, the rate of production equals the rate of loss; about two weeks are needed for a cell to migrate from the basal cell layer to the top of the granular cell layer, and an additional two weeks to cross the stratum corneum.

The dermis is the layer of skin between the epidermis and subcutaneous tissue, and comprises two sections, the papillary dermis and the reticular dermis. The superficial papillary dermis interdigitates with the overlying rete ridges of the epidermis, between which the two layers interact through the basement membrane zone. Structural components of the dermis are collagen, elastic fibers, and ground substance. Within these components are the pilosebaceous units, arrector pili muscles, and the eccrine and apocrine glands. The dermis contains two vascular networks that run parallel to the skin surface—one superficial and one deep plexus—which are connected by vertical communicating vessels. The function of blood vessels within the dermis is fourfold: to supply nutrition, to regulate temperature, to modulate inflammation, and to participate in wound healing.

The subcutaneous tissue is a layer of fat between the dermis and underlying fascia. This tissue may be further divided into two components, the actual fatty layer, or panniculus adiposus, and a deeper vestigial layer of muscle, the panniculus carnosus. The main cellular component of this tissue is the adipocyte, or fat cell. The structure of this tissue is composed of septal (i.e. linear strands) and lobular compartments, which differ in microscopic appearance. Functionally, the subcutaneous fat insulates the body, absorbs trauma, and serves as a reserve energy source.

Conditions of the human integumentary system constitute a broad spectrum of diseases, also known as dermatoses, as well as many nonpathologic states (like, in certain circumstances, melanonychia and racquet nails). While only a small number of skin diseases account for most visits to the physician, thousands of skin conditions have been described. Classification of these conditions often presents many nosological challenges, since underlying etiologies and pathogenetics are often not known. Therefore, most current textbooks present a classification based on location (for example, conditions of the mucous membrane), morphology (chronic blistering conditions), etiology (skin conditions resulting from physical factors), and so on. Clinically, the diagnosis of any particular skin condition is made by gathering pertinent information regarding the presenting skin lesion(s), including the location (such as arms, head, legs), symptoms (pruritus, pain), duration (acute or chronic), arrangement (solitary, generalized, annular, linear), morphology (macules, papules, vesicles), and color (red, blue, brown, black, white, yellow). Diagnosis of many conditions often also requires a skin biopsy which yields histologic information that can be correlated with the clinical presentation and any laboratory data.

== Acneiform eruptions ==
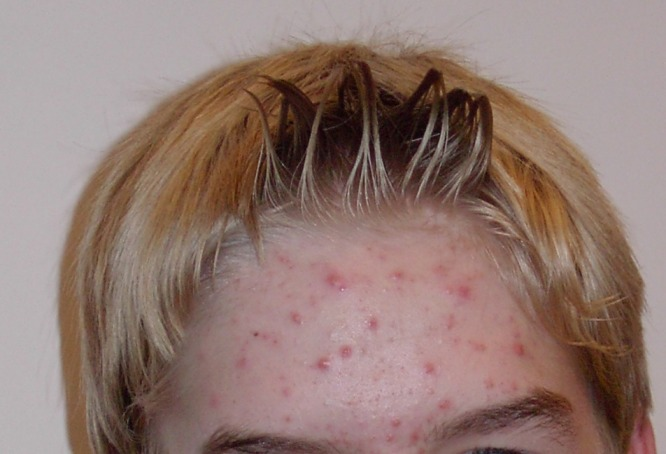
Acne vulgaris

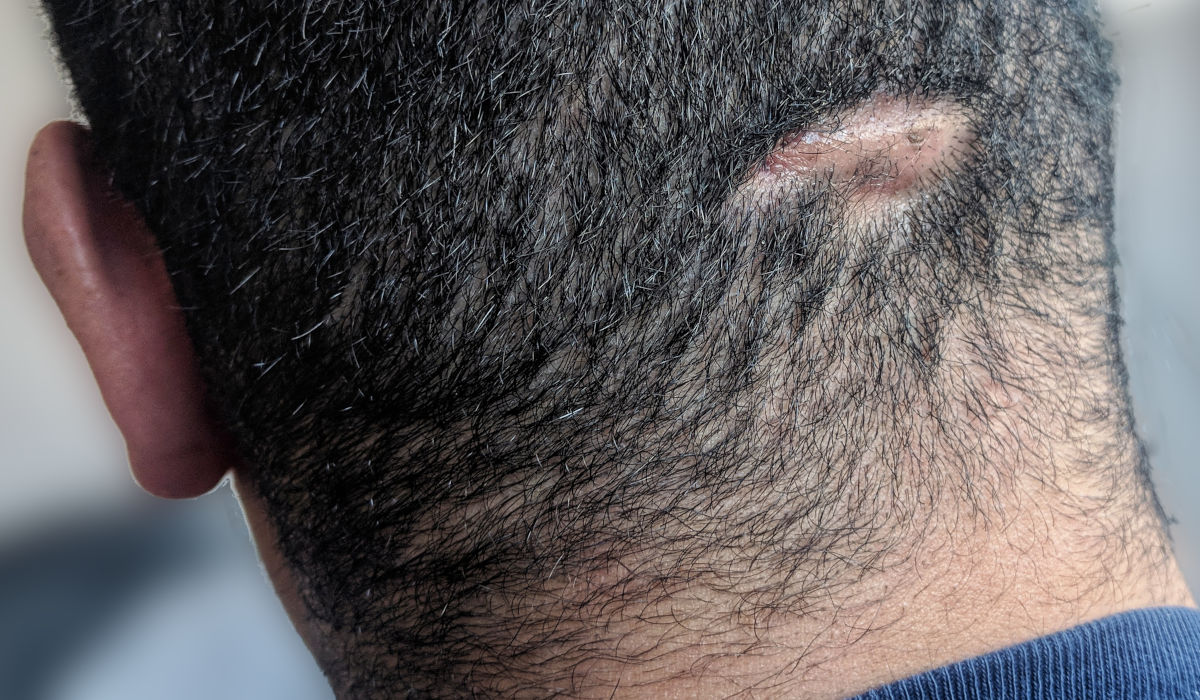
Dissecting cellulitis of the scalp

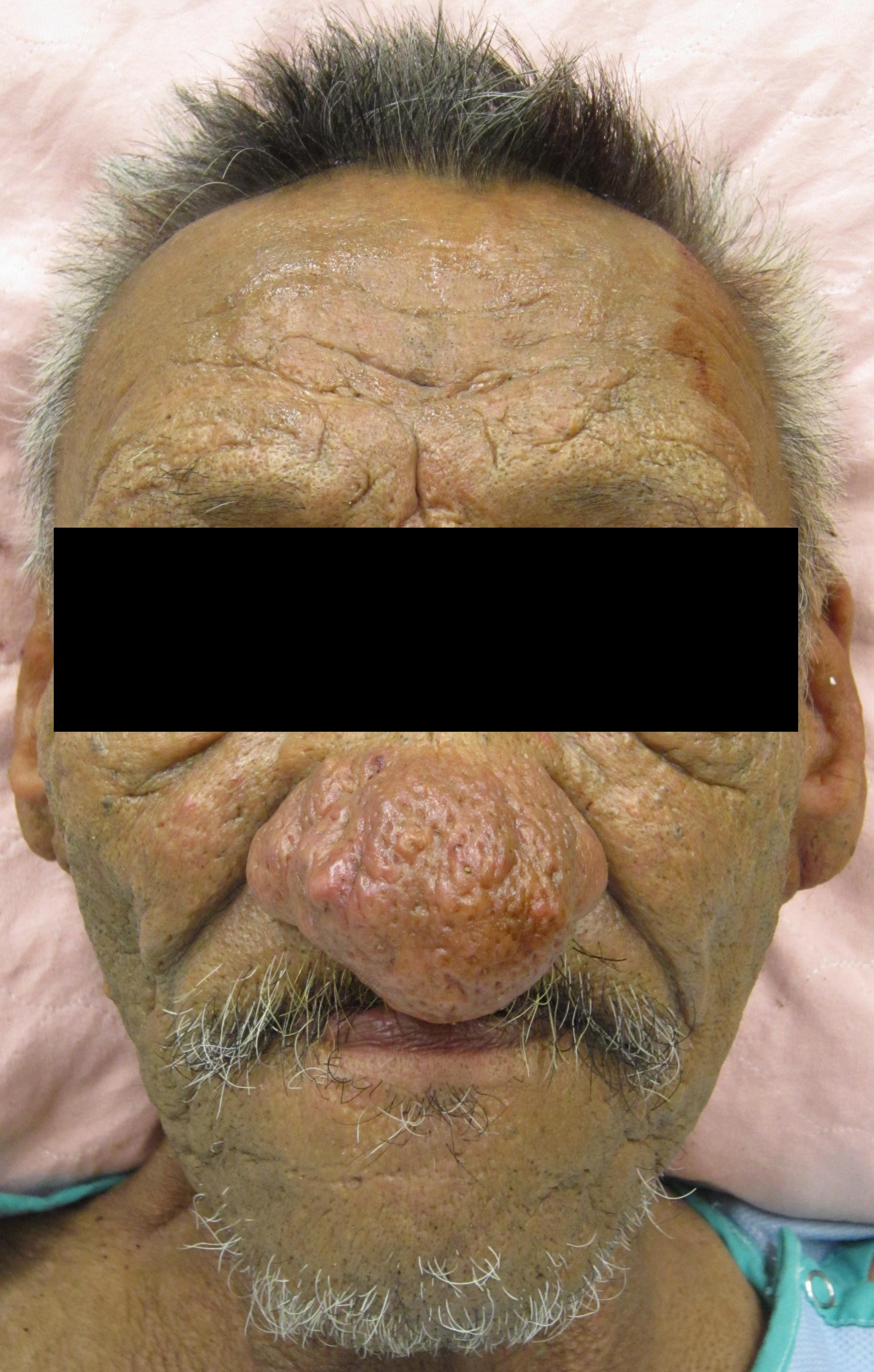
Rhinophyma

Acneiform eruptions are caused by changes in the pilosebaceous unit.

- Acne aestivalis (Mallorca acne) (Note: Any given cutaneous condition is only included once within this list.) (Note: Parentheticals are used to indicate other names by which a condition is known. If there are multiple alternative names for a condition, they are separated by commas within the parenthetical.) (Note: Citations for any given condition name and/or alternative name(s) may be found within the condition's respective article.)
- Acne conglobata
- Acne cosmetica (cosmetic acne)
- Acne fulminans (acute febrile ulcerative acne)
- Acne keloidalis nuchae (acne keloidalis, dermatitis papillaris capillitii, folliculitis keloidalis, folliculitis keloidis nuchae, nuchal keloid acne)
- Acne mechanica
- Acne medicamentosa
- Acne miliaris necrotica (acne varioliformis)
- Acne vulgaris (acne simplex)
- Acne with facial edema (solid facial edema) (Note: This list uses American English; therefore, the symbols æ and œ, which are common to British English, are not used, but, rather, simplified to a single e. For example, the spelling of nevus is favored over nævus, edema over œdema, and so forth. For more information, see American and British English differences.)
- Blepharophyma
- Chloracne
- Erythrotelangiectatic rosacea (erythematotelangiectatic rosacea, vascular rosacea)
- Excoriated acne (acne excoriée des jeunes filles, Picker's acne) (Note: Non-English names are included within this list when those terms are found in English medical literature. Inclusion of acne excoriée des jeunes filles (French), Frambösie (German), and parangi (Malay) represent examples of this convention.)
- Glandular rosacea
- Gnathophyma
- Gram-negative rosacea
- Granulomatous facial dermatitis
- Granulomatous perioral dermatitis
- Halogen acne
- Hidradenitis suppurativa (acne inversa, pyoderma fistulans significa, Verneuil's disease)
- Idiopathic facial aseptic granuloma
- Infantile acne
- Lupoid rosacea (granulomatous rosacea, micropapular tuberculid, rosacea-like tuberculid of Lewandowsky)
- Lupus miliaris disseminatus faciei
- Metophyma
- Neonatal acne (acne infantum, acne neonatorum, neonatal cephalic pustulosis)
- Occupational acne
- Oil acne
- Ocular rosacea (ophthalmic rosacea, ophthalmorosacea)
- Otophyma
- Periorificial dermatitis
- Persistent edema of rosacea (chronic upper facial erythematous edema, Morbihan's disease, rosaceous lymphedema)
- Phymatous rosacea
- Pomade acne
- Papulopustular rosacea (inflammatory rosacea)
- Perifolliculitis capitis abscedens et suffodiens (dissecting cellulitis of the scalp, dissecting folliculitis, perifolliculitis capitis abscedens et suffodiens of Hoffman)
- Perioral dermatitis
- Periorbital dermatitis (periocular dermatitis)
- Pyoderma faciale (rosacea fulminans)
- Rhinophyma
- Rosacea (acne rosacea)
- Rosacea conglobata
- Synovitis–acne–pustulosis–hyperostosis–osteomyelitis syndrome (SAPHO syndrome) (Note: Abbreviations for condition names commonly described in medical literature with an acronym or initialism are included within this list.)
- Steroid rosacea
- Tar acne
- Tropical acne

== Autoinflammatory syndromes ==
Autoinflammatory syndromes are a group of inherited disorders characterized by bouts of inflammatory skin lesions and periodic fevers.

- Blau syndrome
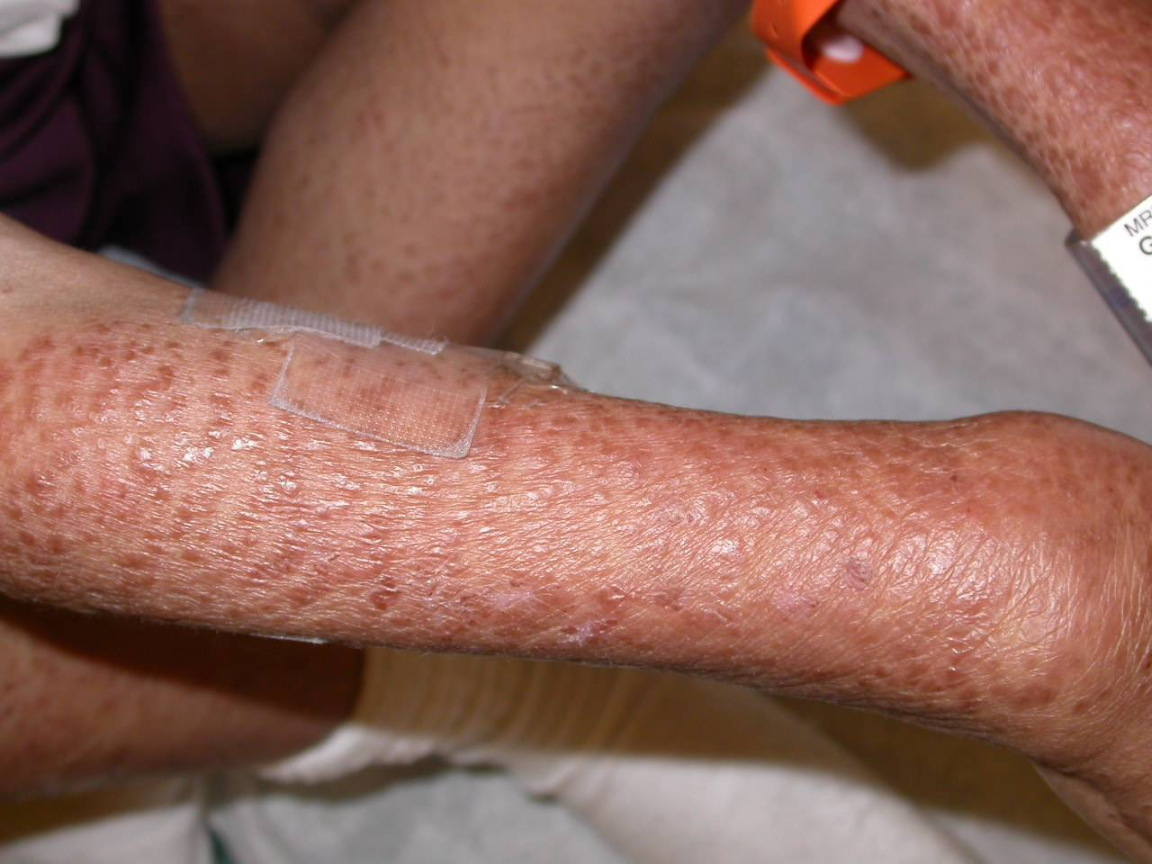
  Blau syndrome
- Chronic infantile neurologic cutaneous and articular syndrome
- Familial cold urticaria (familial cold autoinflammatory syndrome)
- Familial Mediterranean fever
- Hyper-IgD syndrome (Note: Within this list, the term immunoglobulin is abbreviated to Ig when used as a prefix to a specific antibody isotype (i.e. IgA, IgD, IgE, IgG, and IgM).)
- Majeed syndrome
- Muckle–Wells syndrome
- TNF receptor associated periodic syndrome (familial Hibernian fever, TRAPS, tumor necrosis factor receptor associated periodic syndrome)

== Chronic blistering ==
Chronic blistering cutaneous conditions have a prolonged course and present with vesicles and bullae.

- Adult linear IgA disease
- Bullous pemphigoid
- Bullous lupus erythematosus
- Childhood linear IgA disease (chronic bullous disease of childhood)
- Cicatricial pemphigoid (benign mucosal pemphigoid, benign mucous membrane pemphigoid, ocular pemphigus, scarring pemphigoid)
- Dermatitis herpetiformis (Duhring disease)
- Dyshidrosis (recurrent vesicular palmoplantar dermatitis, acute vesiculobullous hand eczema, dyshidrotic dermatitis, pompholyx)
- Endemic pemphigus (endemic pemphigus foliaceus, fogo selvagem)
- Epidermolysis bullosa acquisita
- Grover's disease (benign papular acantholytic dermatosis, persistent acantholytic dermatosis, transient acantholytic dermatosis)
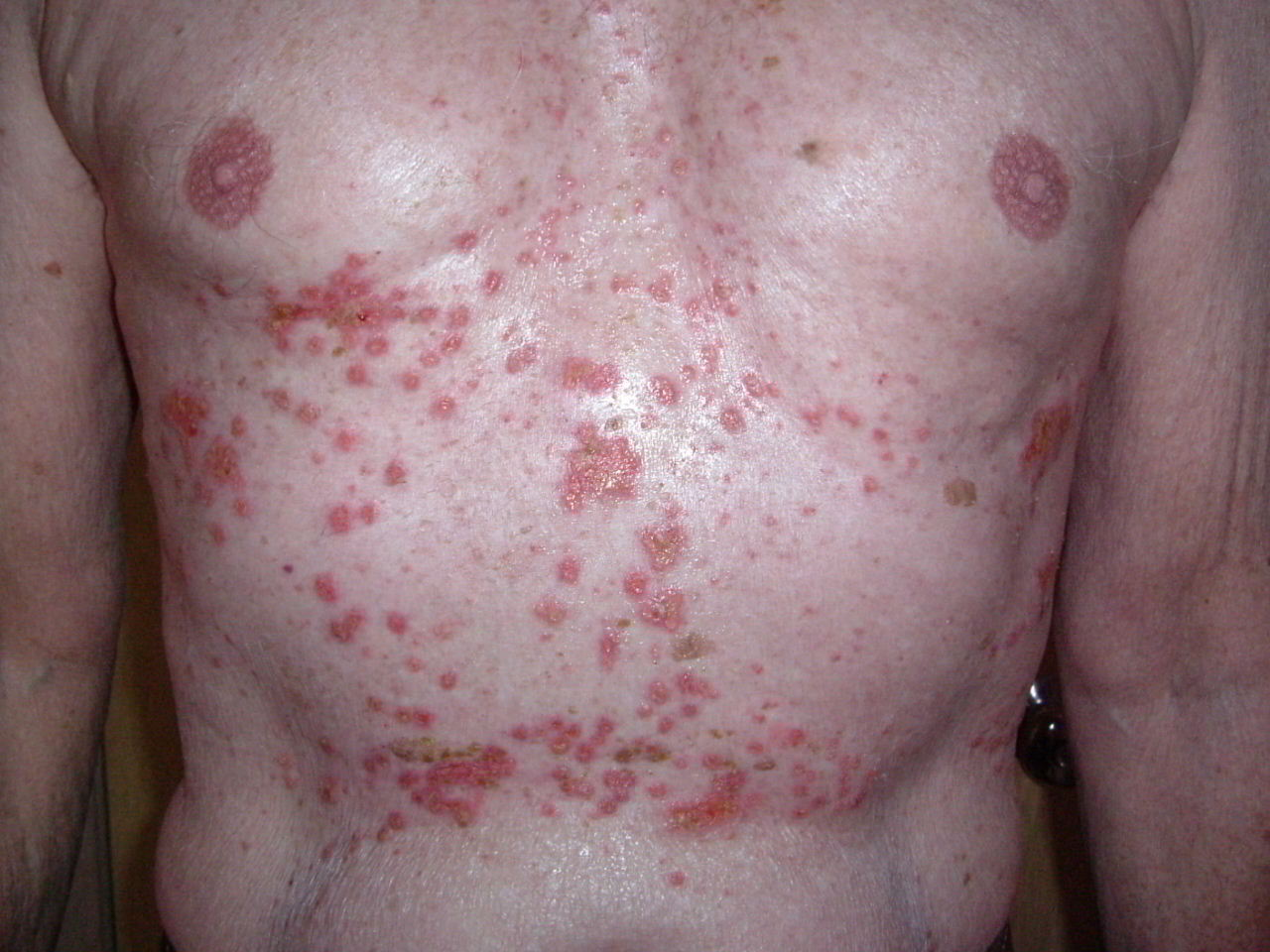
  Grover's disease
- IgA pemphigus
- Intraepidermal neutrophilic IgA dermatosis
- Localized cicatricial pemphigoid (Brunsting–Perry cicatricial pemphigoid)
- Paraneoplastic pemphigus
- Pemphigus erythematosus (Senear–Usher syndrome)
- Pemphigus foliaceus
- Pemphigus herpetiformis (acantholytic herpetiform dermatitis, herpetiform pemphigus, mixed bullous disease, pemphigus controlled by sulfapyridine)
- Pemphigoid nodularis
- Pemphigus vegetans
- Pemphigus vegetans of Hallopeau
- Pemphigus vegetans of Neumann
- Pemphigus vulgaris
- Vesicular pemphigoid
- Vulvar childhood pemphigoid

== Conditions of the mucous membranes ==
Conditions of the mucous membranes involve the moist linings of the eyes, nose, mouth, genitals, and anus.

- Acatalasia (acatalasemia, Takahara's disease)
- Acquired dyskeratotic leukoplakia
- Actinic cheilitis (actinic cheilosis)
- Acute necrotizing ulcerative gingivitis (acute membranous gingivitis, acute necrotizing ulcerative gingivostomatitis, fusospirillary gingivitis, fusospirillosis, fusospirochetal gingivitis, necrotizing gingivitis, phagedenic gingivitis, trench mouth, ulcerative gingivitis, Vincent gingivitis, Vincent infection, Vincent stomatitis, Vincent's disease)
- Allergic contact cheilitis
- Angina bullosa haemorrhagica
- Angular cheilitis (perlèche)
- Behçet's disease (Behçet's syndrome, oculo-oral-genital syndrome)
- Black hairy tongue (hairy tongue, lingua villosa nigra)
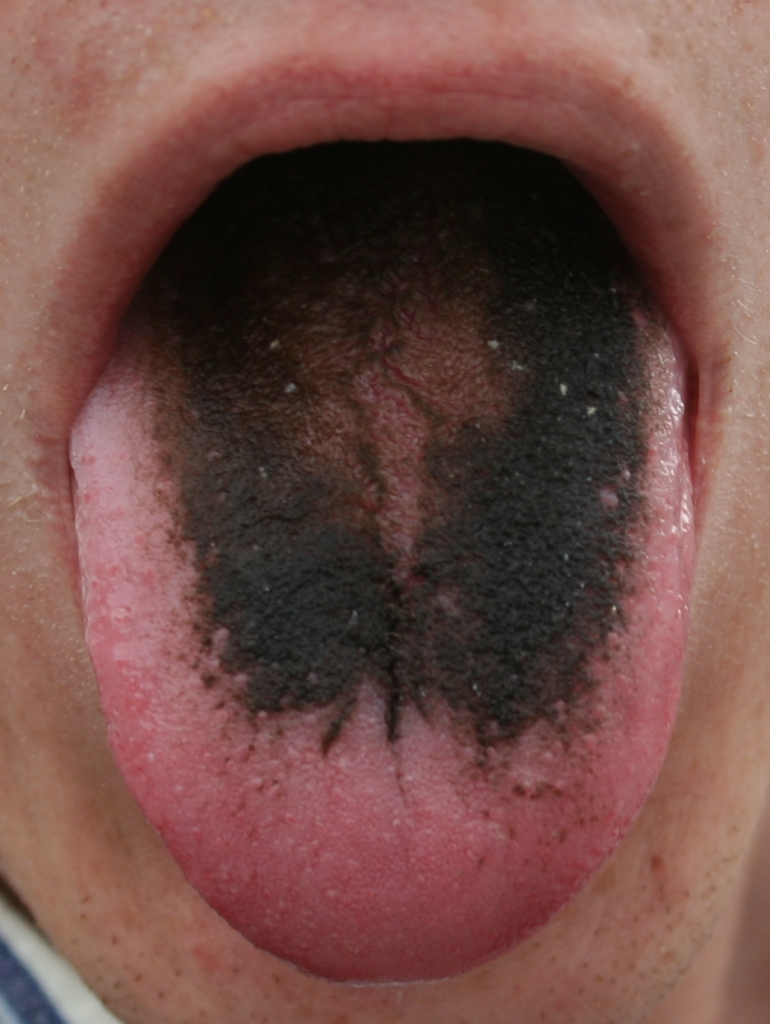
  Black hairy tongue
- Caviar tongue
- Cheilitis exfoliativa
- Cheilitis glandularis
- Cheilitis granulomatosa (granulomatous cheilitis, orofacial granulomatosis)
- Cutaneous sinus of dental origin (dental sinus)
- Cyclic neutropenia
- Desquamative gingivitis
- Drug-induced ulcer of the lip
- Epidermization of the lip
- Epulis
- Epulis fissuratum (granuloma fissuratum)
- Eruptive lingual papillitis
- Erythroplakia (erythroplasia)
- Fissured tongue (furrowed tongue, lingua plicata, plicated tongue, scrotal tongue)
- Geographic tongue (benign migratory glossitis, benign migratory stomatitis, glossitis areata exfoliativa, glossitis areata migrans, lingua geographica, stomatitis areata migrans, transitory benign plaques of the tongue)
- Gingival fibroma
- Gingival hypertrophy
- Hairy leukoplakia (oral hairy leukoplakia)
- Intraoral dental sinus
- Linea alba
- Leukoplakia
- Leukoplakia with tylosis and esophageal carcinoma
- Major aphthous ulcer (periadenitis mucosa necrotica recurrens)
- Median rhomboid glossitis (central papillary atrophy)
- Melanocytic oral lesion
- Melkersson–Rosenthal syndrome
- Morsicatio buccarum (chronic cheek biting, chronic cheek chewing)
- Mucosal squamous cell carcinoma
- Mucous cyst of the oral mucosa (mucocele)
- Nagayama's spots
- Oral Crohn's disease
- Oral florid papillomatosis
- Oral melanosis
- Osseous choristoma of the tongue
- Peripheral ameloblastoma
- Plasma cell cheilitis (plasma cell gingivitis, plasma cell orificial mucositi)
- Plasmoacanthoma
- Proliferative verrucous leukoplakia
- Pyogenic granuloma (eruptive hemangioma, granulation tissue-type hemangioma, granuloma gravidarum, lobular capillary hemangioma, pregnancy tumor, tumor of pregnancy)
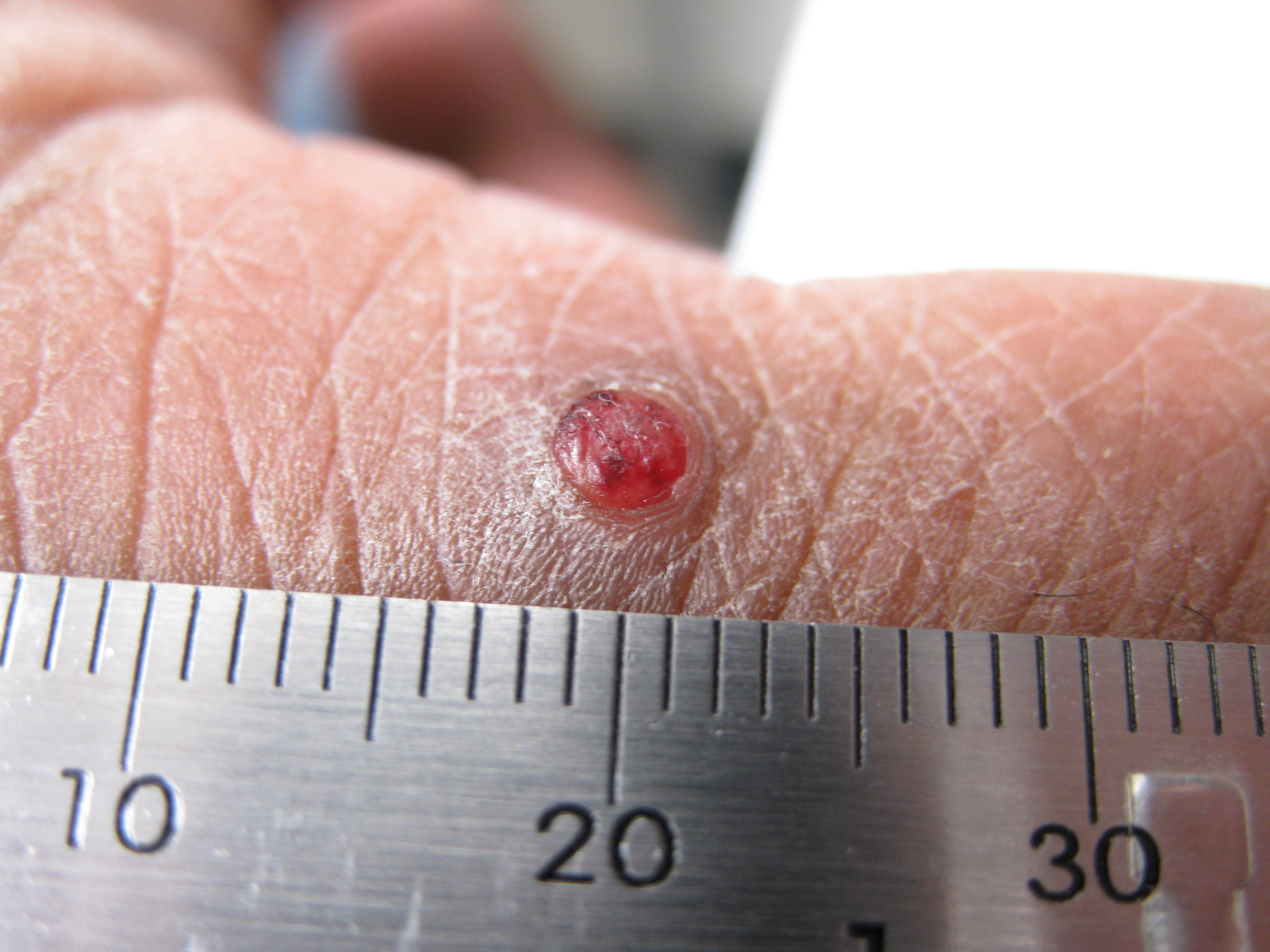
  Pyogenic granuloma
- Pyostomatitis vegetans
- Recurrent aphthous stomatitis (aphthosis, canker sores, recurrent oral aphthae)
- Recurrent intraoral herpes simplex infection
- Smooth tongue (atrophic glossitis, bald tongue, hunter glossitis, moeller)
- Stomatitis nicotina (nicotine stomatitis, smoker's keratosis, smoker's patches)
- Torus palatinus
- Trumpeter's wart
- Vestibular papillomatosis
- White sponge nevus (white sponge nevus of Cannon)

== Conditions of the skin appendages ==
Conditions of the skin appendages are those affecting the glands of the skin, hair, nails, and arrector pili muscles.

- Acne necrotica
- Acquired generalized hypertrichosis (acquired hypertrichosis lanuginosa, hypertrichosis lanuginosa acquisita)
- Acquired perforating dermatosis (acquired perforating collagenosis)
- Acrokeratosis paraneoplastica of Bazex (acrokeratosis neoplastica, Bazex syndrome)
- Acroosteolysis
- Acute paronychia
- Alopecia areata
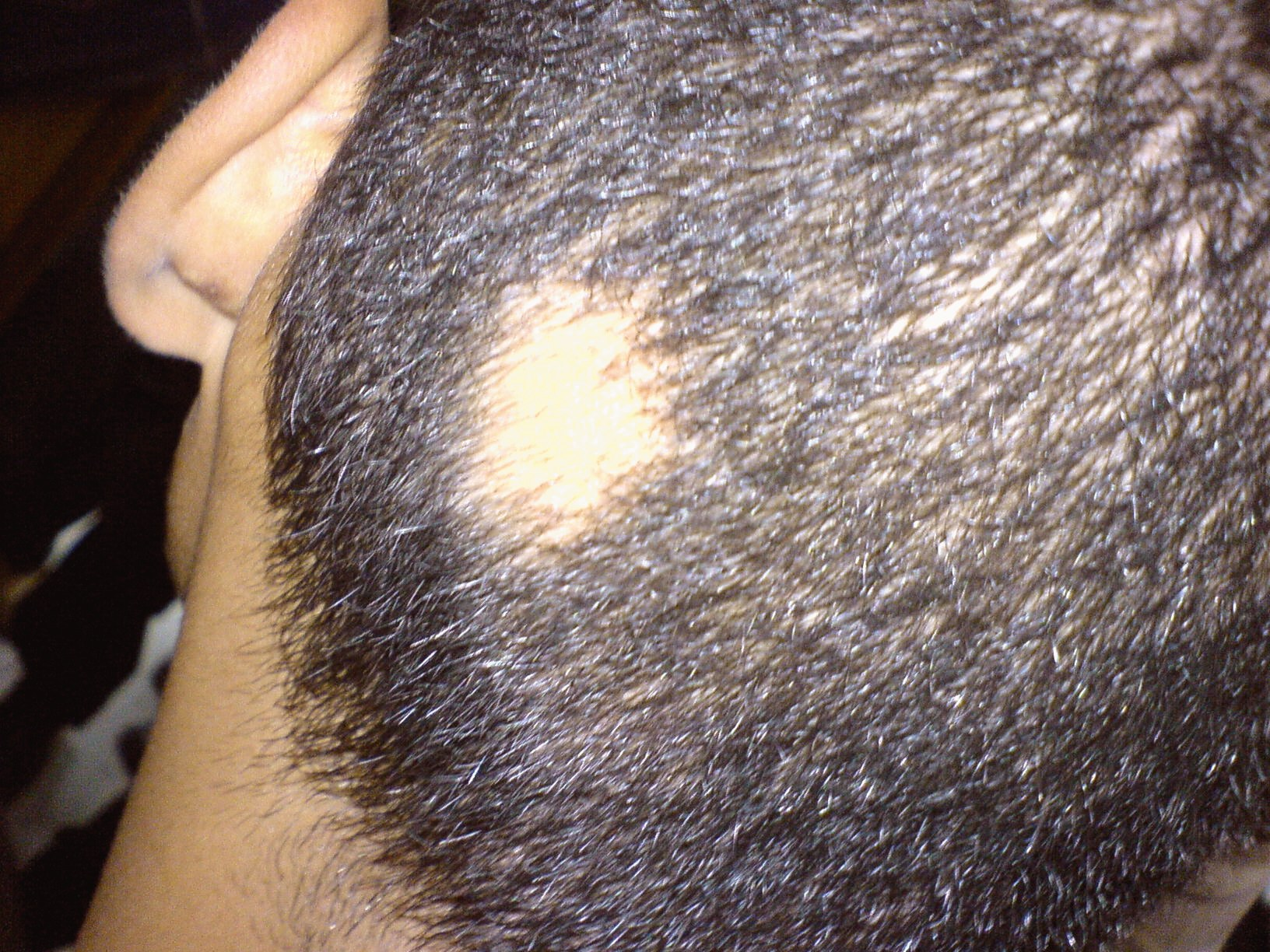
  Alopecia areata
- Alopecia neoplastica
- Anagen effluvium
- Androgenic alopecia (androgenetic alopecia)
- Anhidrosis (hypohidrosis)
- Anonychia
- Apparent leukonychia
- Beau's lines
- Blue nails
- Bromidrosis (apocrine bromhidrosis, fetid sweat, malodorous sweating, osmidrosis)
- Bubble hair deformity
- Central centrifugal cicatricial alopecia (follicular degeneration syndrome, pseudopelade of the central scalp)
- Chevron nail (herringbone nail)
- Chromhidrosis (colored sweat)
- Chronic paronychia
- Cicatricial alopecia
- Clubbing (drumstick fingers, Hippocratic fingers, watch-glass nails)
- Congenital onychodysplasia of the index fingers
- Disseminate and recurrent infundibulofolliculitis
- Erosive pustular dermatitis of the scalp (erosive pustular dermatosis of the scalp)
- Erythromelanosis follicularis faciei et colli
- Folliculitis decalvans
- Folliculitis nares perforans
- Fox–Fordyce disease
- Frontal fibrosing alopecia
- Generalized congenital hypertrichosis (congenital hypertrichosis lanuginosa)
- Generalized hyperhidrosis
- Graham-Little syndrome
- Granulosis rubra nasi
- Green nails
- Gustatory hyperhidrosis
- Hair casts (pseudonits)
- Hair follicle nevus (vellus hamartoma)
- Hairy palms and soles
- Half and half nails (Lindsay's nails)
- Hangnail
- Hapalonychia
- Hematidrosis
- Hirsutism
- Hook nail
- Hot comb alopecia
- Hypertrichosis cubiti (hairy elbow syndrome)
- Hypertrichosis simplex of the scalp
- Intermittent hair–follicle dystrophy
- Keratosis pilaris atrophicans
- Kinking hair (acquired progressive kinking)
- Koenen's tumor (Koenen's periungual fibroma, periungual fibroma)
- Koilonychia (spoon nails)
- Kyrle disease
- Leukonychia (white nails)
- Lichen planopilaris (acuminatus, follicular lichen planus, lichen planus follicularis, peripilaris)
- Lichen planus of the nails
- Lichen spinulosus (keratosis spinulosa)
- Lipedematous alopecia (lipedematous scalp)
- Localized acquired hypertrichosis
- Localized congenital hypertrichosis
- Longitudinal erythronychia
- Longitudinal melanonychia
- Loose anagen syndrome (loose anagen hair syndrome)
- Lupus erythematosus
- Madarosis
- Malalignment of the nail plate
- Male-pattern baldness
- Marie–Unna hereditary hypotrichosis (Marie–Unna hypotrichosis)
- Median nail dystrophy (dystrophia unguis mediana canaliformis, median canaliform dystrophy of Heller, solenonychia)
- Mees' lines
- Melanonychia
- Menkes kinky hair syndrome (kinky hair disease, Menkes disease)
- Monilethrix (beaded hair)
- Muehrcke's nails (Muehrcke's lines)
- Nail–patella syndrome (Fong syndrome, hereditary osteoonychodysplasia, HOOD syndrome)
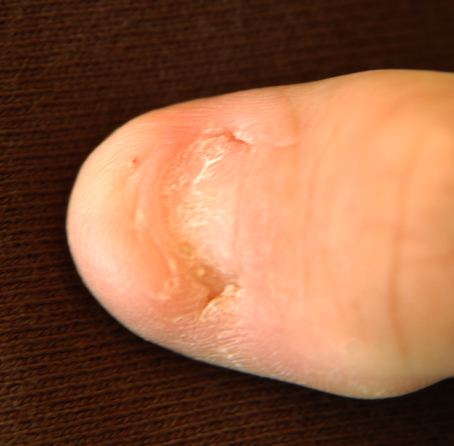
  Nail–patella syndrome
- Neoplasms of the nailbed
- Nevoid hypertrichosis
- Noncicatricial alopecia
- Onychauxis
- Onychoatrophy
- Onychocryptosis (ingrown nail, unguis incarnatus)
- Onychogryphosis (ram's horn nails)
- Onycholysis
- Onychomadesis
- Onychomatricoma
- Onychophagia (nail biting)
- Onychophosis
- Onychoptosis defluvium (alopecia unguium)
- Onychorrhexis (brittle nails)
- Onychoschizia
- Onychotillomania
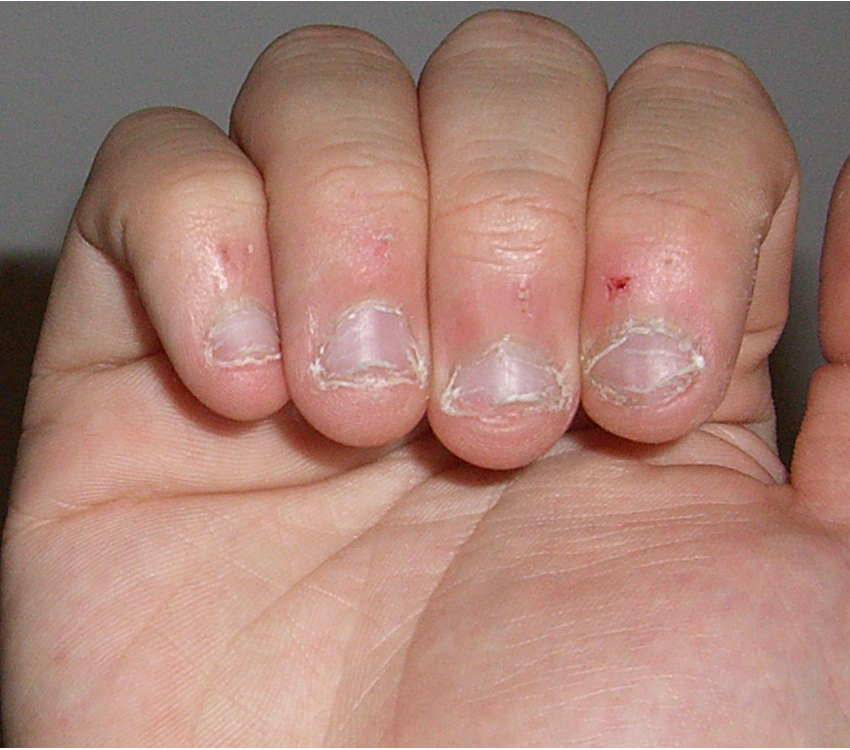
  Onychotillomania
- Ophiasis
- Palmoplantar hyperhidrosis (emotional hyperhidrosis)
- Parakeratosis pustulosa
- Patterned acquired hypertrichosis
- Perforating folliculitis
- Pili annulati (ringed hair)
- Pili bifurcati
- Pili multigemini
- Pili pseudoannulati (pseudo pili annulati)
- Pili torti (twisted hairs)
- Pincer nails (omega nails, trumpet nails)
- Pityriasis amiantacea (tinea amiantacea)
- Platonychia
- Plica neuropathica (felted hair)
- Plummer's nail
- Premature greying of hair
- Prepubertal hypertrichosis
- Pressure alopecia (postoperative alopecia, pressure-induced alopecia)
- Pseudofolliculitis barbae (barber's itch, folliculitis barbae traumatica, razor bumps, scarring pseudofolliculitis of the beard, shave bumps)
- Pseudopelade of Brocq (alopecia cicatrisata)
- Psoriatic nails
- Pterygium inversum unguis (pterygium inversus unguis, ventral pterygium)
- Pterygium unguis (dorsal pterygium)
- Purpura of the nail bed
- Racquet nail (brachyonychia, nail en raquette, racquet thumb)
- Recurrent palmoplantar hidradenitis (idiopathic palmoplantar hidradenitis, idiopathic plantar hidradenitis, painful plantar erythema, palmoplantar eccrine hidradenitis, plantar panniculitis)
- Red lunulae
- Ross' syndrome
- Rubinstein–Taybi syndrome
- Setleis syndrome
- Shell nail syndrome
- Short anagen syndrome
- Splinter hemorrhage
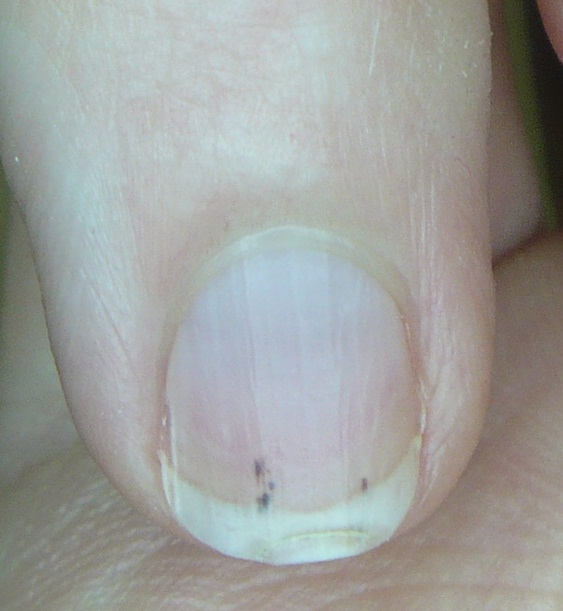
  Splinter hemorrhage
- Spotted lunulae
- Staining of the nail plate
- Subungual hematoma
- Telogen effluvium
- Terry's nails
- Traction alopecia
- Traumatic alopecia
- Traumatic anserine folliculosis
- Triangular alopecia (temporal alopecia, temporal triangular alopecia)
- Trichomegaly
- Trichomycosis axillaris
- Trichorrhexis invaginata (bamboo hair)
- Trichorrhexis nodosa
- Trichostasis spinulosa
- Tufted folliculitis
- Tumor alopecia
- Twenty-nail dystrophy (sandpapered nails, trachyonychia)
- Uncombable hair syndrome (cheveux incoiffable, pili trianguli et canaliculi, spun-glass hair)
- Wooly hair nevus (woolly hair nevus)
- X-linked hypertrichosis

== Conditions of the subcutaneous fat ==
Conditions of the subcutaneous fat are those affecting the layer of adipose tissue that lies between the dermis and underlying fascia.

- Acquired generalized lipodystrophy (Lawrence syndrome, Lawrence–Seip syndrome)
- Adiposis dolorosa (Dercum's disease)
- Alpha-1 antitrypsin deficiency panniculitis (alpha1-protease deficiency panniculitis, alpha1-proteinase deficiency panniculitis)
- Atrophic connective tissue panniculitis
- Barraquer–Simons syndrome (acquired partial lipodystrophy, cephalothoracic lipodystrophy, progressive lipodystrophy)
- Benign symmetric lipomatosis (benign symmetric lipomatosis of Launois–Bensaude, Madelung's disease)
- Centrifugal abdominal lipodystrophy (centrifugal lipodystrophy, lipodystrophia centrifugalis abdominalis infantalis)
- Chronic erythema nodosum (erythema nodosum migrans, subacute migratory panniculitis of Vilanova and Piñol, subacute nodular migratory panniculitis)
  Chronic erythema nodosum
- Cold panniculitis (popsicle panniculitis)
- Congenital generalized lipodystrophy (Berardinelli–Seip syndrome)
- Cytophagic histiocytic panniculitis
- Drug-induced lipodystrophy
- Factitial panniculitis
- Familial partial lipodystrophy (Köbberling–Dunnigan syndrome)
- Gouty panniculitis
- Hemihyperplasia–multiple lipomatosis syndrome
- HIV-associated lipodystrophy (Note: Within this list, the terms human immunodeficiency virus and acquired immunodeficiency syndrome are abbreviated to HIV and AIDS, respectively.)
- Involutional lipoatrophy
- Lipoatrophia annularis (Ferreira–Marques lipoatrophia)
- Lipoatrophia semicircularis (semicircular lipoatrophy)
- Lipodermatosclerosis (chronic panniculitis with lipomembranous changes, hypodermitis sclerodermiformis, sclerosing panniculitis, stasis panniculitis)
- Lipohypertrophy
- Localized lipodystrophy
- Neutrophilic lobular panniculitis
- Nodular vasculitis
- Non-progressive late-onset linear hemifacial lipoatrophy
- Pancreatic panniculitis (enzymatic panniculitis, pancreatic fat necrosis, subcutaneous fat necrosis)
- Poland's syndrome
- Post-steroid panniculitis
- Sclerema neonatorum
- Sclerosing lipogranuloma (paraffinoma)
- Septal panniculitis
- Subcutaneous fat necrosis of the newborn
- Traumatic panniculitis
- Tumor lysis syndrome
- Weber–Christian disease (relapsing febrile nonsuppurative panniculitis)

== Congenital anomalies ==
Cutaneous congenital anomalies are a diverse group of disorders that result from faulty morphogenesis, the biological process that forms the shape of a human body.

- Accessory nail of the fifth toe
- Accessory tragus (ear tag, preauricular appendage, preauricular tag)
- Amniotic band syndrome (ADAM complex, amniotic band sequence, congenital constriction bands, pseudoainhum)
- Aplasia cutis congenita (cutis aplasia, congenital absence of skin, congenital scars)
- Arteriovenous fistula
- Benign neonatal hemangiomatosis
- Branchial cyst (branchial cleft cyst)
- Bronchogenic cyst
- Capillary hemangioma (infantile hemangioma, nevus maternus, strawberry hemangioma, strawberry nevus)
- Cavernous venous malformation
- Congenital cartilaginous rest of the neck (cervical accessory tragus, wattle)
- Congenital erosive and vesicular dermatosis
- Congenital hypertrophy of the lateral fold of the hallux
- Congenital lip pit (congenital sinus of the lower lip, lip sinus, midline sinus of the upper lip)
- Congenital malformations of the dermatoglyphs
- Congenital smooth muscle hamartoma
- Cystic lymphatic malformation
- Dermoid cyst
- Diffuse neonatal hemangiomatosis
- Encephalocele
- Familial disseminated comedones without dyskeratosis
- Focal facial dermal dysplasia
- Hutchinson's teeth
- Hyperkeratotic cutaneous capillary-venous malformation
- Intrauterine epidermal necrosis
- Limb–mammary syndrome
- Lowry–MacLean syndrome
- Macrocheilia
- Macrocystic lymphatic malformation
- Malignant pilomatricoma (pilomatrical carcinoma, pilomatrix carcinoma)
- Maternal autoimmune bullous disease
- Median raphe cyst
- Melanotic neuroectodermal tumor of infancy
- Membranous aplasia cutis
- Microcystic lymphatic malformation
- Midline cervical cleft
- Mongolian spot (congenital dermal melanocytosis, dermal melanocytosis)
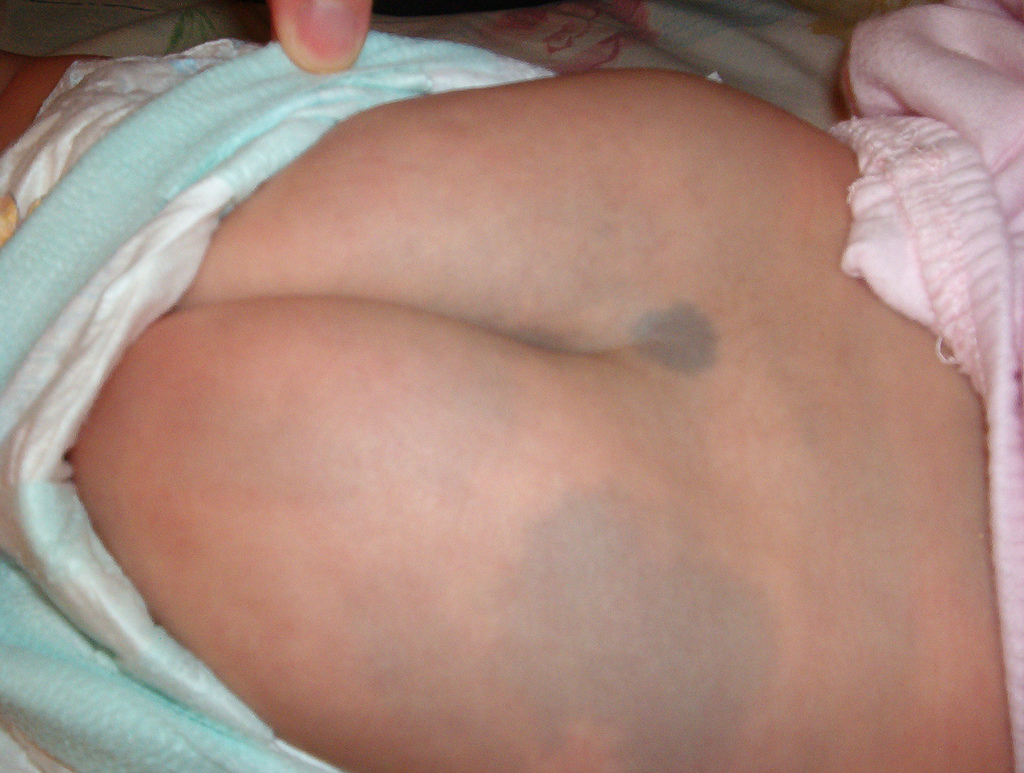
  Mongolian spot
- Mulberry molar
- Nager acrofacial dysostosis
- Nasal glioma (brain-like heterotopia, cephalic brain-like heterotopia, glial hamartoma, heterotopic neuroglial tissue, nasal cerebral heterotopia, nasal heterotopic brain tissue)
- Nasolacrimal duct cyst
- Nevus psiloliparus
- Non-involuting congenital hemangioma
- Omphalomesenteric duct cyst (omphalomesenteric duct remnant, vitelline cyst)
- PELVIS syndrome
- Pilomatricoma (calcifying epithelioma of Malherbe, Malherbe calcifying epithelioma, pilomatrixoma)
- Poland anomaly
- Posterior fossa malformations–hemangiomas–arterial anomalies–cardiac defects–eye abnormalities–sternal cleft and supraumbilical raphe syndrome (PHACE association, PHACES syndrome)
- Preauricular sinus and cyst (ear pit, congenital auricular fistula, congenital preauricular fistula, preauricular cyst)
- Rapidly involuting congenital hemangioma (congenital nonprogressive hemangioma)
- Rosenthal–Kloepfer syndrome
- Rudimentary supernumerary digit (rudimentary polydactyly)
- SACRAL syndrome
- Sinus pericranii
- Skin dimple (skin fossa)
- Superficial lymphatic malformation (lymphangioma circumscriptum)
- Supernumerary nipple (accessory nipple, pseudomamma)
- Thyroglossal duct cyst
- Verrucous vascular malformation (angiokeratoma circumscriptum naeviforme)

== Connective tissue diseases ==
Connective tissue diseases are caused by a complex array of autoimmune responses that target or affect collagen or ground substance.

- Acute cutaneous lupus erythematosus
- Atrophoderma of Pasini and Pierini (dyschromic and atrophic variation of scleroderma, morphea plana atrophica, sclérodermie atrophique d'emblée)
- Calcinosis–Raynaud phenomenon–esophageal dysmotility–sclerodactyly–telangiectasia syndrome (CREST syndrome)
- Chilblain lupus erythematosus (chilblain lupus erythematosus of Hutchinson)
- Childhood dermatomyositis
- Childhood discoid lupus erythematosus
- Childhood systemic lupus erythematosus
- Complement deficiency syndromes
- Dermatomyositis
- Ehlers–Danlos syndrome
- Eosinophilia–myalgia syndrome
- Frontal linear scleroderma (en coup de sabre, morphea en coup de sabre)
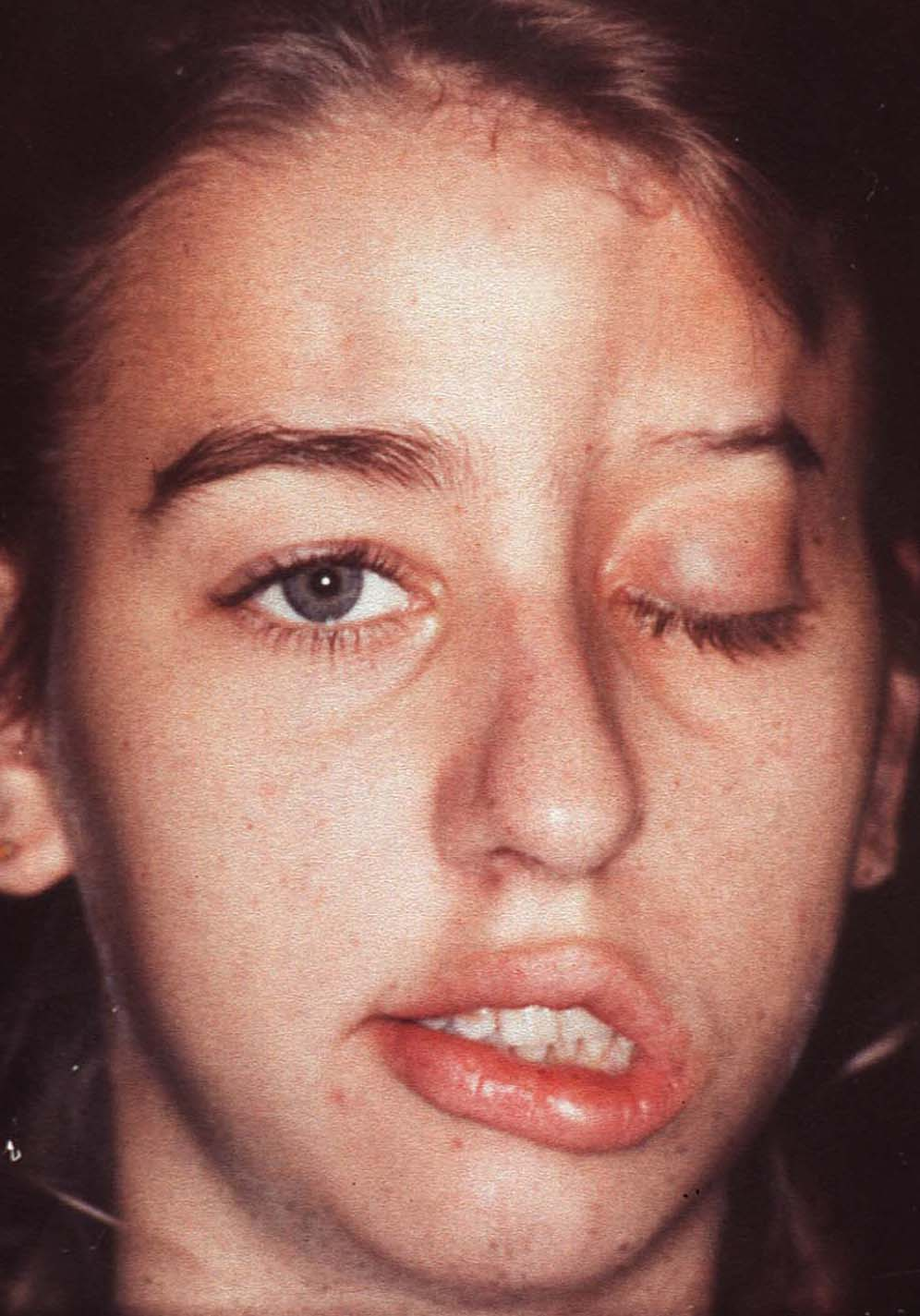
  Frontal linear scleroderma
- Generalized discoid lupus erythematosus
- Generalized morphea
- Interstitial granulomatous dermatitis
- Juvenile rheumatoid arthritis (juvenile idiopathic arthritis, Still's disease)
- Keloid morphea
- Linear atrophoderma of Moulin (Moulin atrophoderma linearis)
- Linear scleroderma
- Localized discoid lupus erythematosus
- Localized morphea
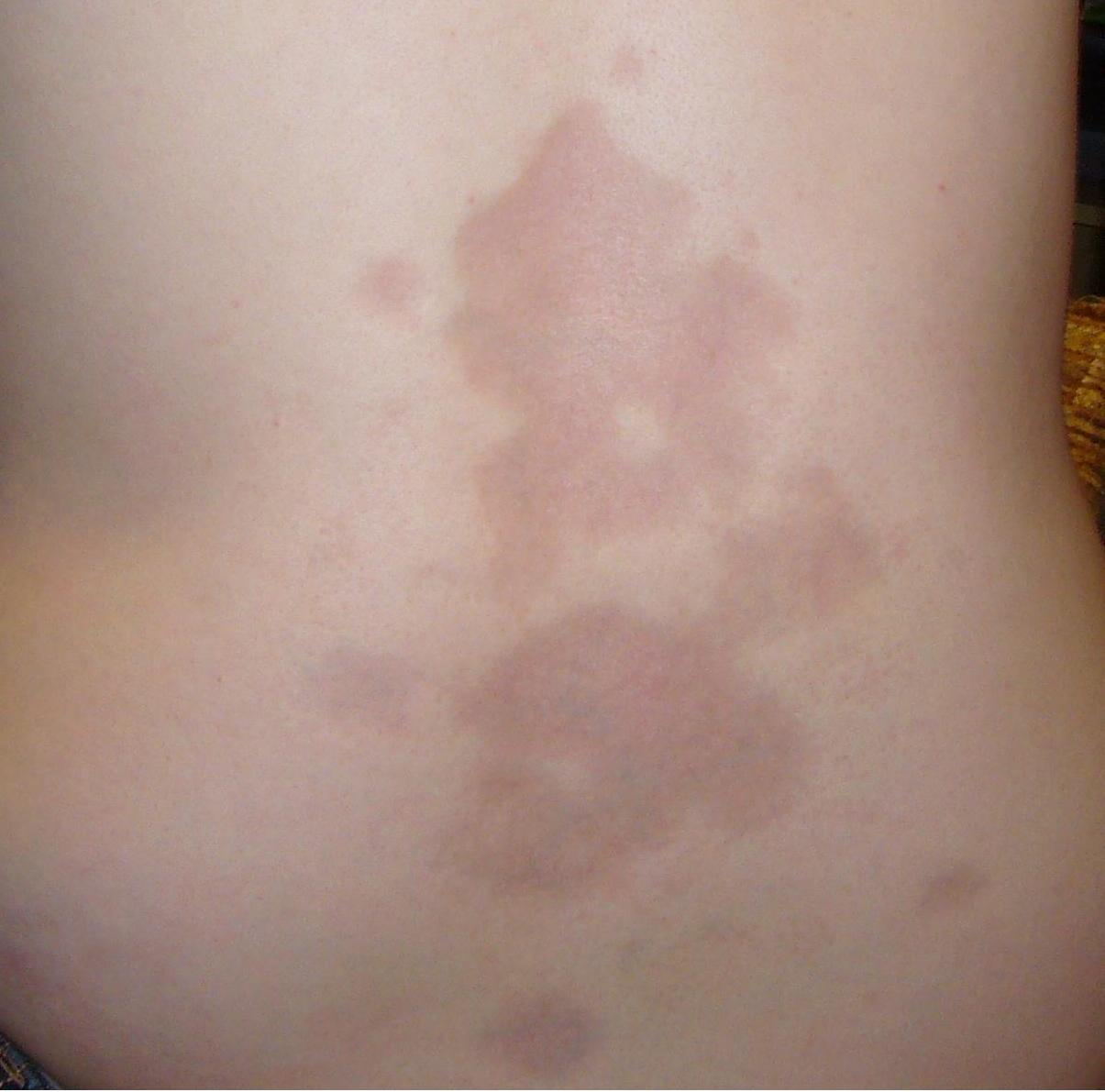
  Localized morphea
- Lupus erythematosus panniculitis (lupus erythematosus profundus, lupus panniculitis, lupus profundus, subcutaneous lupus erythematosus)
- Lupus erythematosus–lichen planus overlap syndrome (lichen planus–lupus erythematosus overlap syndrome)
- Methotrexate-induced papular eruption
- Mixed connective tissue disease (Sharp's syndrome, undifferentiated connective tissue disease)
- Morphea profunda
- Morphea–lichen sclerosus et atrophicus overlap
- Mouth and genital ulcers with inflamed cartilage syndrome (MAGIC syndrome)
- Neonatal lupus erythematosus
- Nephrogenic systemic fibrosis (nephrogenic fibrosing dermopathy)
- Nicolau–Balus syndrome
- Nodulosis–arthropathy–osteolysis syndrome
- Normophosphatemic familial tumoral calcinosis
- Palisaded neutrophilic and granulomatous dermatitis
- Pansclerotic morphea
- Parry–Romberg syndrome (progressive hemifacial atrophy)
- Progressive systemic sclerosis
- Relapsing polychondritis (atrophic polychondritis, systemic chondromalacia)
- Rheumatoid arthritis
- Rheumatoid nodulosis (accelerated rheumatoid nodulosis)
- Rheumatoid vasculitis
- Rowell's syndrome
- Scleredema adultorum (Bushke disease, scleredema diabeticorum, scleredema adultorum of Buschke, scleredema of Buschke)
- Silicosis
- Sjögren's syndrome (Mikulicz disease, Sicca syndrome)
- Subacute cutaneous lupus erythematosus
- Systemic lupus erythematosus
- Toxic oil syndrome
- Tumid lupus erythematosus (lupus erythematosus tumidus)
- Tuzun syndrome
- Verrucous lupus erythematosus (hypertrophic lupus erythematosus)
- Winchester syndrome

=== Abnormalities of dermal fibrous and elastic tissue ===
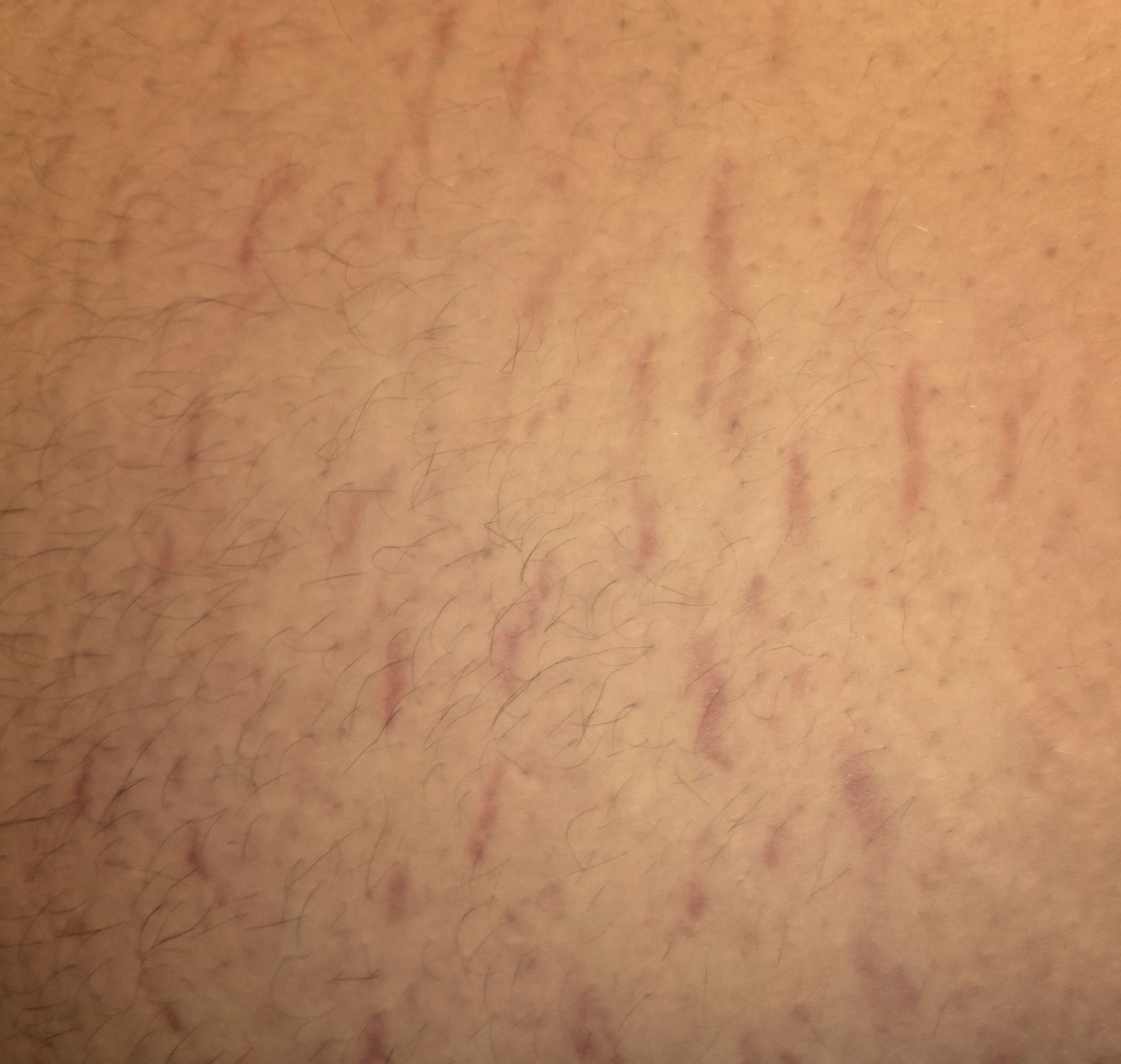
Striae distensae

Abnormalities of dermal fibrous and elastic tissue are caused by problems in the regulation of collagen synthesis or degradation.

- Acrodermatitis chronica atrophicans (Herxheimer disease, primary diffuse atrophy)
- Actinic elastosis (solar elastosis)
- Anetoderma (anetoderma maculosa, anetoderma maculosa cutis, atrophia maculosa cutis, macular atrophy)
- Blepharochalasis
- Cutis laxa (chalazoderma, dermatochalasia, dermatolysis, dermatomegaly, generalized elastolysis, generalized elastorrhexis, pachydermatocele)
- Cutis rhomboidalis nuchae
- Ehlers–Danlos syndrome (cutis hyperelastica, elastic skin, India rubber skin)
- Elastosis perforans serpiginosa
- Homocystinuria
- Jadassohn–Pellizzari anetoderma
- Linear focal elastosis (elastotic striae)
- Loeys–Dietz syndrome
- Marfan syndrome
- Occipital horn syndrome
- Osteogenesis imperfecta (Lobstein syndrome)
- Perforating calcific elastosis (localized acquired cutaneous pseudoxanthoma elasticum, perforating periumbilical calcific elastosis, periumbilical perforating pseudoxanthoma elasticum)
- Pseudoxanthoma elasticum (Grönblad–Strandberg syndrome)
- Reactive perforating collagenosis
- Schweninger–Buzzi anetoderma
- Sclerotic fibroma
- Striae atrophicans
- Striae distensae
- Ullrich disease
- Verrucous perforating collagenoma
- Wrinkly skin syndrome

== Dermal and subcutaneous growths ==
Dermal and subcutaneous growths result from (1) reactive or neoplastic proliferation of cellular components of the dermis or subcutaneous tissue, or (2) neoplasms invading or aberrantly present in the dermis.

- Acquired progressive lymphangioma (benign lymphangioendothelioma)
- Acral fibrokeratoma (acquired digital fibrokeratoma, acquired periungual fibrokeratoma)
- Acrochordon (cutaneous papilloma, cutaneous tag, fibroepithelial polyp, fibroma molluscum, fibroma pendulum, papilloma colli, skin tag, soft fibroma, Templeton skin tag)
- Adenoma sebaceum
- Adult type of generalized eruption of cutaneous mastocytosis
- African cutaneous Kaposi sarcoma
- African lymphadenopathic Kaposi sarcoma
- Aggressive infantile fibromatosis
- AIDS-associated Kaposi sarcoma
- Ainhum (bankokerend, dactylolysis spontanea, sukhapakla)
- Angiofibroma
- Angiokeratoma
- Angiokeratoma of Fordyce (angiokeratoma of the scrotum and vulva)
  Angiokeratoma of Fordyce
- Angiokeratoma of Mibelli (Mibelli's angiokeratoma, telangiectatic warts)
- Angioleiomyoma (vascular leiomyoma)
- Angiolipoleiomyoma
- Angiolipoma
- Angioma serpiginosum
- Angiosarcoma
- Aponeurotic fibroma (calcifying aponeurotic fibroma, juvenile aponeurotic fibroma)
- Atypical fibroxanthoma
- Benign lipoblastomatosis (embryonic lipoma)
- Buschke–Ollendorff syndrome (dermatofibrosis lenticularis disseminata)
- Capillary aneurysms
- Carcinoid
- Cellular angiofibroma
- Cherry angioma (De Morgan spot, senile angioma)
- Chondrodermatitis nodularis chronica helicis (chondrodermatitis nodularis helicis)
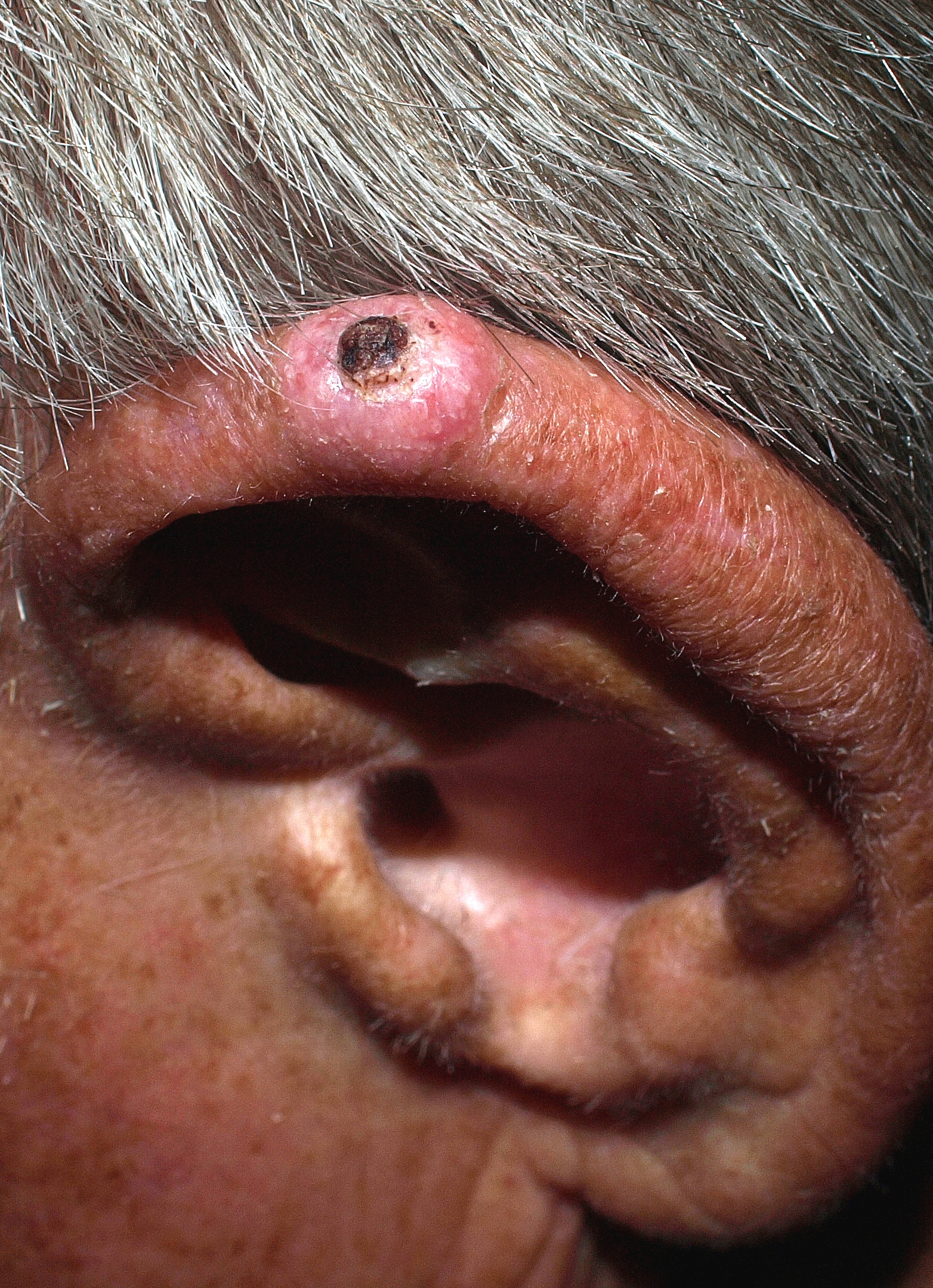
  Chondrodermatitis nodularis chronica helicis
- Chondroid lipoma
- Chordoma
- Classic Kaposi sarcoma
- Collagenous fibroma (desmoplastic fibroblastoma)
- Composite hemangioendothelioma
- Connective tissue nevus (collagenoma, elastoma, shagreen patch)
- Cutaneous endometriosis
- Cutaneous meningioma (heterotopic meningeal tissue, rudimentary meningocele)
- Cutaneous myelofibrosis
- Cutaneous myxoma
- Cutis marmorata telangiectatica congenita (congenital generalized phlebectasia, Van Lohuizen syndrome)
- Dermal dendrocyte hamartoma
- Dermatofibroma (benign fibrous histiocytoma, dermal dendrocytoma, fibrous dermatofibroma, fibrous histiocytoma, fibroma simplex, histiocytoma, nodular subepidermal fibrosis, sclerosing hemangioma)
- Dermatofibrosarcoma protuberans
- Desmoid tumor
- Diffuse cutaneous mastocytosis
- Diffuse infantile fibromatosis
- Dupuytren's contracture (Dupuytren's diathesis, Dupuytren's disease, palmar fibromatosis)
- Eccrine angiomatous hamartoma
- Elastofibroma dorsi
- Endovascular papillary angioendothelioma (Dabska tumor, Dabska-type hemangioendothelioma, hobnail hemangioendothelioma, malignant endovascular papillary angioendothelioma, papillary intralymphatic angioendothelioma)
- Epithelioid cell histiocytoma
- Epithelioid hemangioendothelioma
- Epithelioid sarcoma
- Erythrodermic mastocytosis
- Extraskeletal chondroma (chondroma of soft parts)
- Familial myxovascular fibromas
- Fascial hernia
- Fibroma of tendon sheath
- Fibromatosis colli (sternomastoid tumor of infancy)
- Fibrous hamartoma of infancy
- Fibrous papule of the nose (benign solitary fibrous papule, fibrous papule of the face)
- Folded skin with scarring (Michelin tire baby syndrome)
- Fordyce's spot (Fordyce's disease)
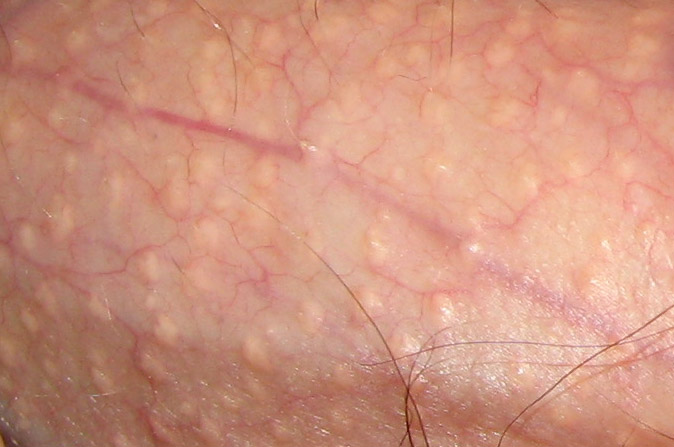
  Fordyce's spot
- Ganglion cyst
- Ganglioneuroma
- Gardner fibroma
- Genital leiomyoma (dartoic leiomyoma)
- Giant cell fibroblastoma
- Giant cell tumor of the tendon sheath (giant cell synovioma, localized nodular tenosynovitis, pigmented villonodular synovitis)
- Glomeruloid hemangioma
- Glomus tumor (glomangioma, solid glomus tumor, solitary glomus tumor)
- Granular cell tumor (Abrikossoff's tumor, Abrikossov's tumor, granular cell myoblastoma, granular cell nerve sheath tumor, granular cell schwannoma)
- Hamartoma
- Hemangiopericytoma
- Hemangiosarcoma
- Hibernoma (fetal lipoma, lipoma of embryonic fat, lipoma of immature adipose tissue)
- Hypertrophic scar
- Immunosuppression-associated Kaposi sarcoma
- Infantile digital fibromatosis (inclusion body fibromatosis, infantile digital myofibroblastoma, Reye tumor)
- Infantile hemangiopericytoma (congenital hemangiopericytoma)
- Infantile myofibromatosis (congenital generalized fibromatosis, congenital multicentric fibromatosis)
- Infantile systemic hyalinosis (juvenile systemic hyalinosis)
- Intradermal spindle cell lipoma
- Intravascular papillary endothelial hyperplasia (Masson's hemangio-endotheliome vegetant intravasculaire, Masson's lesion, Masson's pseudoangiosarcoma, Masson's tumor, papillary endothelial hyperplasia)
- Juvenile hyaline fibromatosis (fibromatosis hyalinica multiplex juvenilis, Murray–Puretic–Drescher syndrome)
- Kaposiform hemangioendothelioma (infantile kaposiform hemangioendothelioma)
- Kasabach–Merritt syndrome (hemangioma with thrombocytopenia)
- Keloid (Keloidal scar)
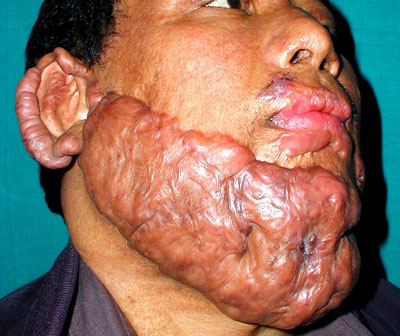
  Keloid
- Keratinizing metaplasia
- Keratocyst
- Klippel–Trenaunay syndrome (angioosteohypertrophy syndrome, hemangiectatic hypertrophy)
- Knuckle pads (heloderma)
- Leiomyosarcoma
- Lipoma
- Liposarcoma (atypical lipoma, atypical lipomatous tumor)
- Lymphangiectasis (lymphangioma)
- Lymphangiomatosis
- Malignant fibrous histiocytoma
- Malignant peripheral nerve sheath tumor (malignant schwannoma, neurofibrosarcoma, neurosarcoma)
- Mast cell sarcoma
- Meningocele
- Metastatic carcinoma
- Microvenular hemangioma (microcapillary hemangioma)
- Midline nevus flammeus (angel's kiss, salmon patch)
- Multifocal lymphangioendotheliomatosis (congenital cutaneovisceral angiomatosis with thrombocytopenia, multifocal lymphangioendotheliomatosis with thrombocytopenia)
- Multinucleate cell angiohistocytoma
- Multiple cutaneous and uterine leiomyomatosis syndrome (leiomyomatosis cutis et uteri, multiple leiomyomatosis, Reed's syndrome)
- Multiple cutaneous leiomyoma (pilar leiomyoma)
- Neural fibrolipoma
- Neuroblastoma (infantile neuroblastoma, neuroepithelioma)
- Neuroma cutis
- Neurothekeoma (bizarre cutaneous neurofibroma, cutaneous lobular neuromyxoma, myxoma of the nerve sheath, myxomatous perineurioma, nerve sheath myxoma)
- Nevus flammeus (capillary malformation, port-wine stain)
- Nevus flammeus nuchae (stork bite)
- Nevus lipomatosus superficialis (nevus lipomatosis of Hoffman and Zurhelle)
- Nevus oligemicus
- Nodular fasciitis (nodular pseudosarcomatous fasciits, pseudosarcomatous fasciitis, subcutaneous pseudosarcomatous fibromatosis)
- Oral submucous fibrosis
- Pachydermodactyly
- Palisaded encapsulated neuroma
- Paraneoplastic syndrome
- Pearly penile papules (hirsuties coronae glandis, hirsutoid papillomas)
- Peyronie's disease (induratio penis plastica)
- Phakomatosis pigmentovascularis
- Piloleiomyoma
- Plantar fibromatosis (Ledderhose's disease)
- Pleomorphic fibroma
- Pleomorphic lipoma
- Plexiform fibrohistiocytic tumor
- Porokeratotic eccrine ostial and dermal duct nevus
- Progressive nodular histiocytoma
- Proliferating angioendotheliomatosis
- Prominent inferior labial artery
- Pseudo-ainhum
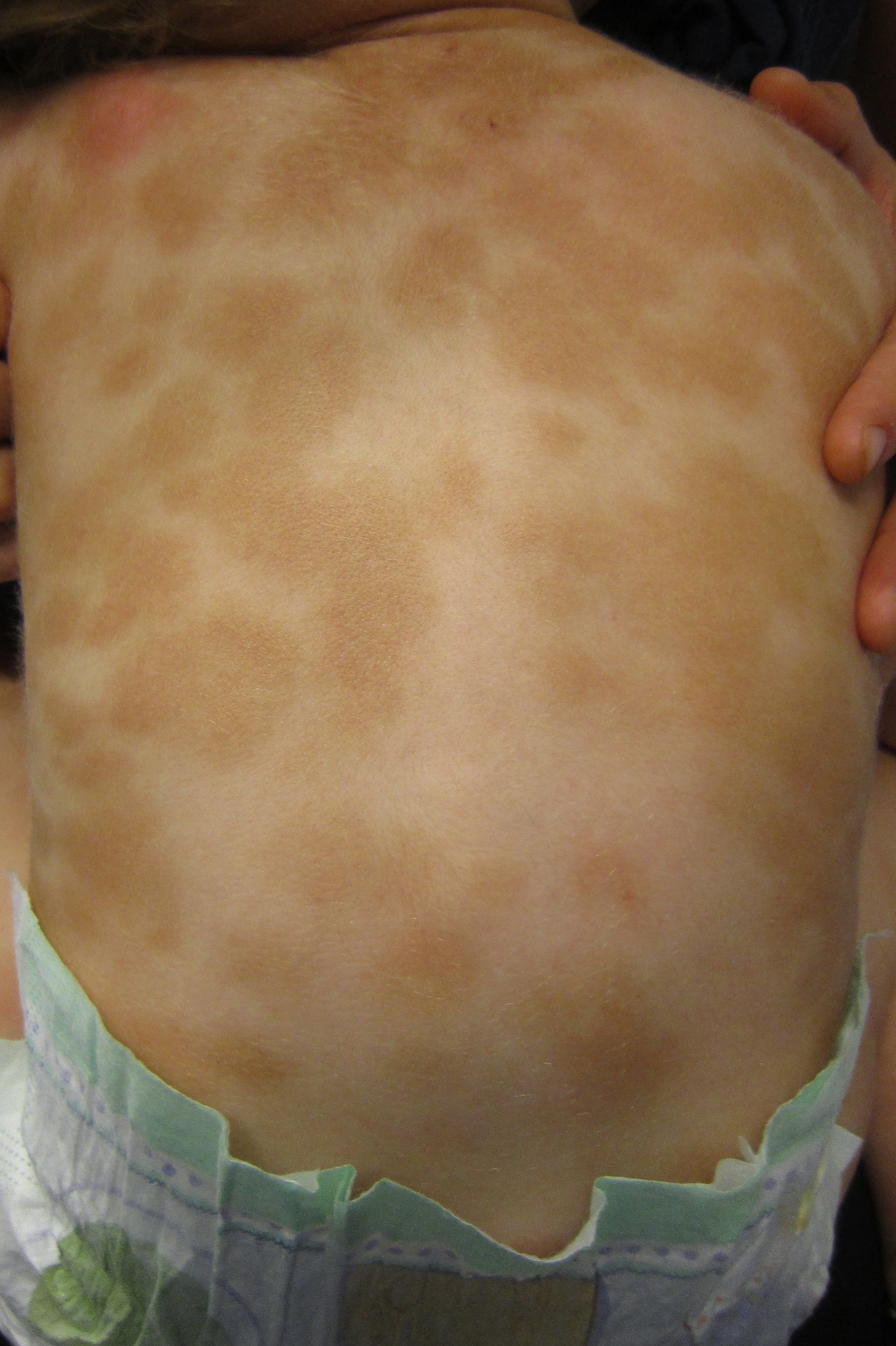
  Urticaria pigmentosa
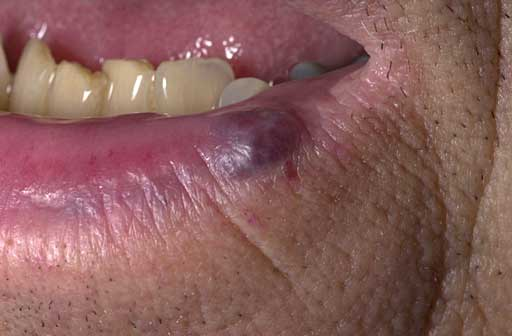
  Venous lake
- Retiform hemangioendothelioma (hobnail hemangioendothelioma)
- Schwannoma (acoustic neuroma, neurilemmoma, neurinoma, neurolemmoma, Schwann cell tumor)
- Solitary angiokeratoma
- Solitary cutaneous leiomyoma
- Solitary mastocytoma
- Solitary neurofibroma (plexiform neurofibroma, solitary nerve sheath tumor, sporadic neurofibroma)
- Spider angioma (nevus araneus, spider telangiectasia, spider nevus, vascular spider)
- Spindle cell hemangioendothelioma (spindle cell hemangioma)
- Spindle cell lipoma
- Sternal cleft
- Subungual exostosis
- Superficial acral fibromyxoma
- Systemic mastocytosis
- Targetoid hemosiderotic hemangioma (hobnail hemangioma)
- Telangiectasia
- Telangiectasia macularis eruptiva perstans
- Teratoma
- Tufted angioma (acquired tufted angioma, angioblastoma, angioblastoma of Nakagawa, hypertrophic hemangioma, progressive capillary hemangioma, tufted hemangioma)
- Umbilical granuloma
- Universal angiomatosis (generalized telangiectasia)
- Urticaria pigmentosa (childhood type of generalized eruption of cutaneous mastocytosis)
- Venous lake (phlebectasis)
- Wildervanck syndrome
- Xanthelasmoidal mastocytosis
- Zosteriform metastasis

== Dermatitis ==
Dermatitis is a general term for "inflammation of the skin".

- Childhood granulomatous periorificial dermatitis
- Essential dermatitis

=== Atopic ===
Atopic dermatitis is a chronic dermatitis associated with a hereditary tendency to develop allergies to food and inhalant substances.

- Atopic dermatitis (atopic eczema, disseminated neurodermatitis, flexural eczema, infantile eczema, prurigo diathsique)

=== Contact ===
Contact dermatitis is caused by certain substances coming in contact with the skin.

- Abietic acid dermatitis
- Acid-induced
- Acrylic monomer dermatitis
- Adhesive dermatitis
- African blackwood dermatitis
- Airbag dermatitis (airbag burn)
- Alkali-induced
- Allergic
- Antifungal agent-induced
- Antimicrobial agent-induced
- Arsenic dermatitis
- Artificial nail-induced
- Axillary antiperspirant-induced
- Axillary deodorant-induced
- Baboon syndrome
- Black dermatographism
- Bleaching cream-induced
- Capsaisin-induced
- Chemical burn
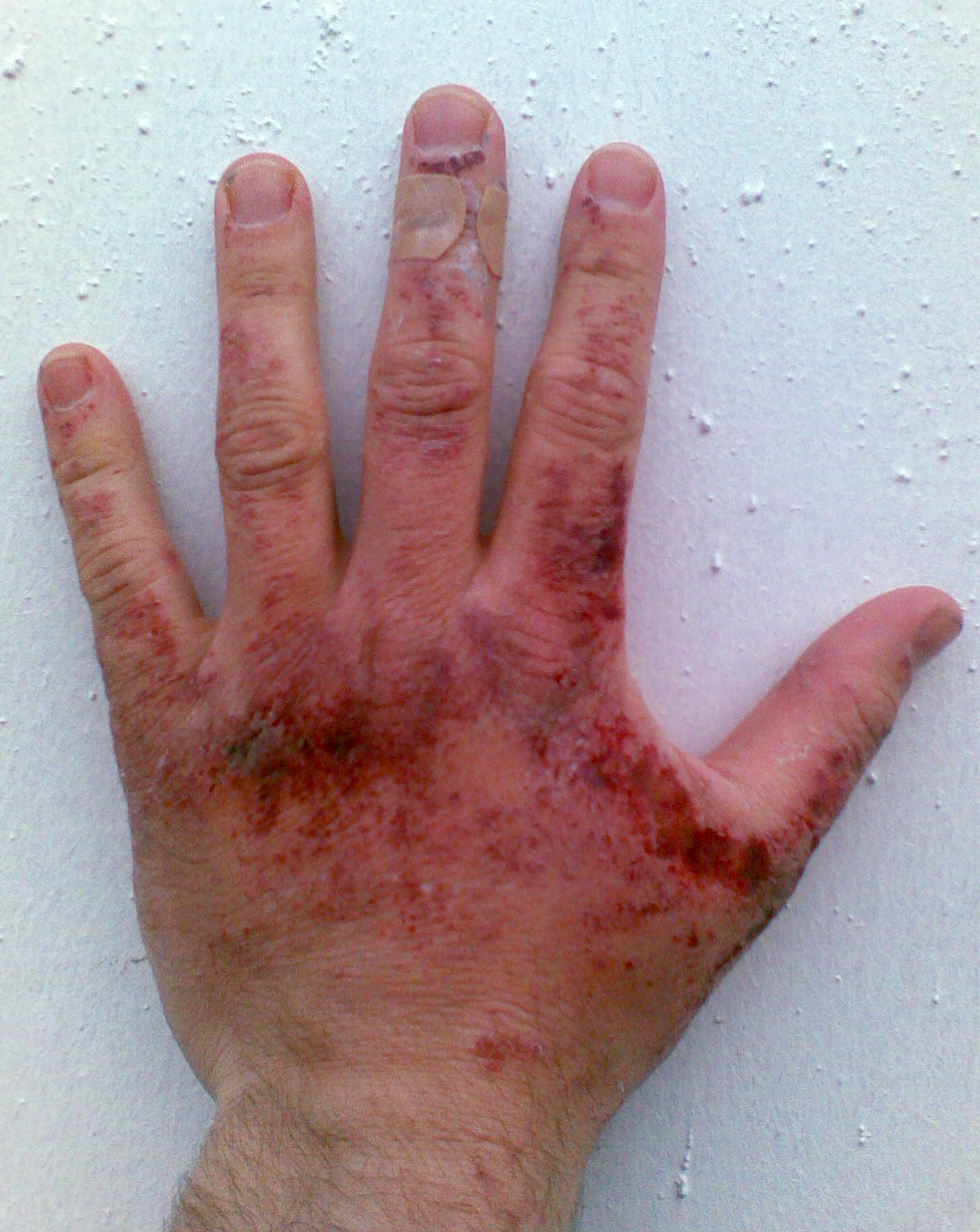
  Chemical burn
- Chloracne
- Chrome dermatitis
- Clothing-induced
- Cobalt dermatitis
- Contact stomatitis (contact lichenoid reaction, lichenoid amalgam reaction, oral mucosal cinnamon reaction)
- Contact urticaria
- Corticosteroid-induced
- Cosmetic dermatitis
- Cosmetic intolerance syndrome
- Dentifrice-induced
- Dermatitis from metals and metal salts
- Dust-induced
- Epoxy resin dermatitis
- Ethylenediamine-induced
- Eye makeup-induced
- Fiberglass dermatitis
- Flower-induced
- Formaldehyde-induced
- Formaldehyde-releasing agent-induced
- Fragrance-induced
- Gold dermatitis
- Hair bleach-induced
- Hair dye-induced
- Hair lotion-induced
- Hair spray-induced
- Hair straightener-induced
- Hair tonic-induced
- Houseplant-induced
- Hydrocarbon-induced
- Irritant folliculitis
- Lacquer dermatitis (lacquer sensitivity)
- Lanolin-induced
- Lipstick-induced
- Local anesthetic-induced
- Makassar ebony dermatitis
- Marine plant-induced
- Mechanical irritant dermatitis
- Mercury dermatitis
- Mouthwash-induced
- Nail lacquer-induced
- Nail polish remover-induced
- Nickel dermatitis
- Occupation-induced
- p-Chloro-meta-xylenol-induced
- Paraben-induced
- Paraphenylenediamine dermatitis
- Permanent wave preparation-induced
- Phenothiazine drug-induced
- Photoallergic
- Photoirritant
- Plant derivative-induced
- Pollen-induced
- Polyester resin dermatitis
- Propylene glycol-induced
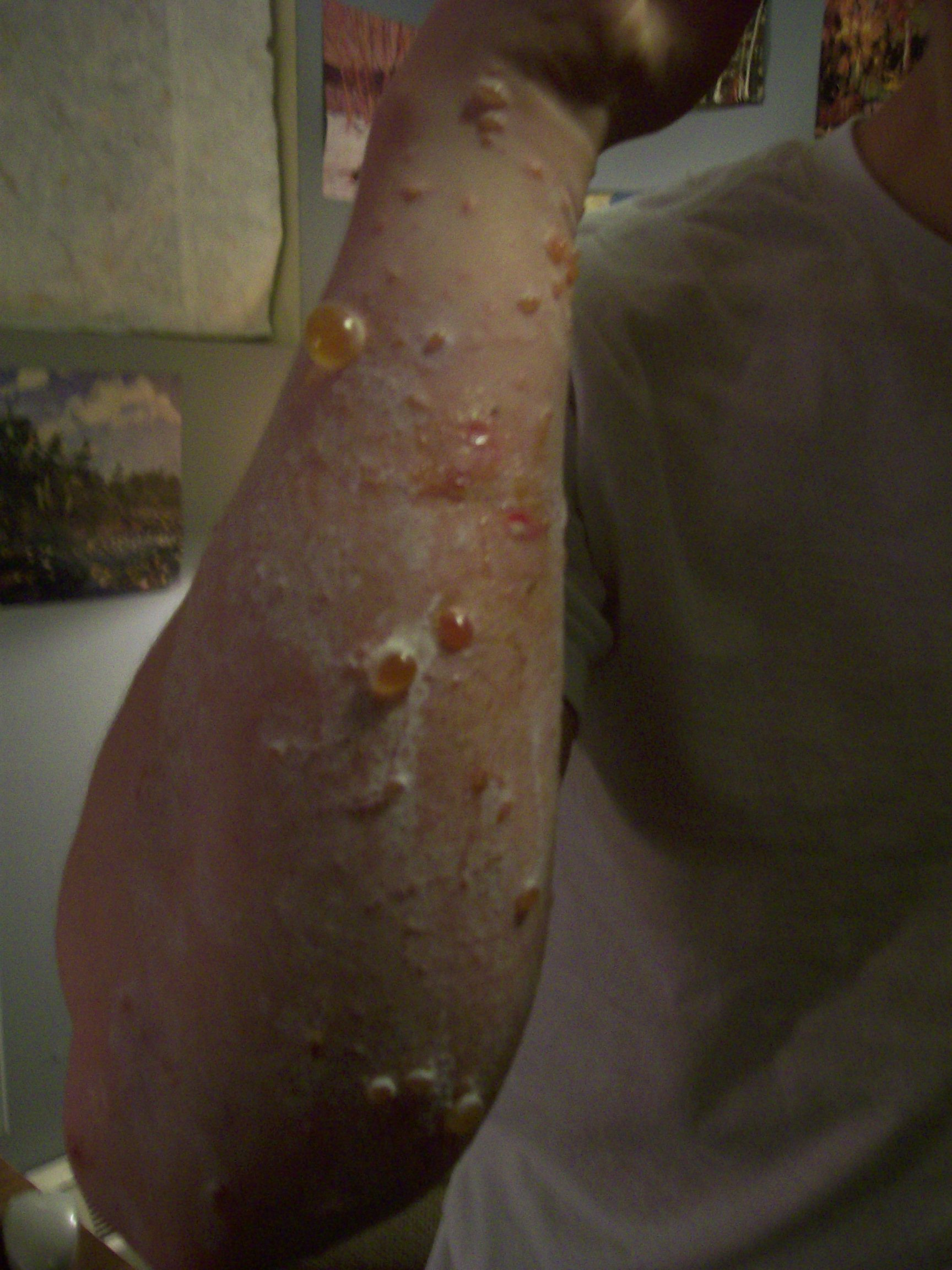
  Toxicodendron dermatitis
- Protein contact dermatitis
- Quaternium-15 hypersensitivity
- Reed dermatitis
- Rosewood dermatitis
- Rosin dermatitis
- Rubber dermatitis
- Seed-induced
- Shoe dermatitis
- Solvent-induced
- Sorbic acid-induced
- Subjective irritant contact dermatitis (sensory irritant contact dermatitis)
- Sunscreen-induced
- Systemic contact dermatitis
- Tear gas dermatitis
- Textile dermatitis
- Traumatic irritant contact dermatitis
- Tree-associated plant-induced
- Tree-induced
- Tulip fingers
- Urushiol-induced
- Vegetable-induced

=== Eczema ===
Eczema refers to a broad range of conditions that begin as spongiotic dermatitis and may progress to a lichenified stage.

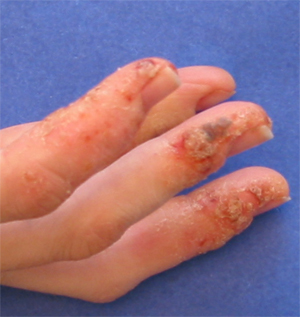
Dyshidrosis

- Autoimmune estrogen dermatitis
- Autoimmune progesterone dermatitis
- Autosensitization dermatitis
- Breast eczema (nipple eczema)
- Chronic vesiculobullous hand eczema
- Circumostomy eczema
- Dyshidrosis (acute vesiculobullous hand eczema, cheiropompholyx, dyshidrotic eczema, pompholyx, podopompholyx)
- Ear eczema
- Eyelid dermatitis
- Hand eczema
- Hyperkeratotic hand dermatitis
- Id reaction (disseminated eczema, generalized eczema)
- Irritant diaper dermatitis (diaper dermatitis, napkin dermatitis)
- Juvenile plantar dermatosis (atopic winter feet, dermatitis plantaris sicca, forefoot dermatitis, moon-boot foot syndrome, sweaty sock dermatitis)
- Molluscum dermatitis
- Nummular dermatitis (discoid eczema, microbial eczema, nummular eczema, nummular neurodermatitis)
- Nutritional deficiency eczema
- Sulzberger–Garbe syndrome (oid-oid disease)
- Xerotic eczema (asteatotic eczema, desiccation dermatitis, eczema craquelé, pruritus hiemalis, winter eczema, winter itch)

=== Pustular ===
Pustular dermatitis is an inflammation of the skin that presents with pustular lesions.

- Eosinophilic pustular folliculitis (Ofuji's disease, sterile eosinophilic pustulosis)
- Reactive arthritis
- Subcorneal pustular dermatosis (Sneddon–Wilkinson disease)

=== Seborrheic ===
Seborrheic dermatitis is a chronic, superficial, inflammatory disease characterized by scaling on an erythematous base.

- Infantile seborrheic dermatitis
- Leiner's disease
- Pityriasis simplex capillitii (dandruff)
- Seborrheic dermatitis (seborrheic eczema)

== Disturbances of pigmentation ==
Disturbances of human pigmentation, either loss or reduction, may be related to loss of melanocytes or the inability of melanocytes to produce melanin or transport melanosomes correctly.

- Albinism–black lock–cell migration disorder of the neurocytes of the gut–deafness syndrome (ABCD syndrome)
- Albinism–deafness syndrome (Woolf syndrome, Ziprkowski–Margolis syndrome)
- Alezzandrini syndrome
- Argyria
- Arsenic poisoning
  Vitiligo
- Berlin syndrome
- Pigmentation changes caused by the bioaccumulation of pigments, e.g. Canthaxanthin
- Chédiak–Higashi syndrome
- Chrysiasis
- Cross–McKusick–Breen syndrome (Cross syndrome, oculocerebral-hypopigmentation syndrome)
- Dermatopathia pigmentosa reticularis (dermatopathia pigmentosa reticularis hyperkeratotica et mutilans, dermatopathia pigmentosa reticularis hypohidotica et atrophica, dermatopathic pigmentosa reticularis)
- Dyschromatosis symmetrica hereditaria (reticulate acropigmentation of Dohi, symmetrical dyschromatosis of the extremities)
- Dyschromatosis universalis hereditaria
- Elejalde syndrome (Griscelli syndrome type 1)
- Eruptive hypomelanosis
- Familial progressive hyperpigmentation
- Galli–Galli disease
- Griscelli syndrome type 2 (partial albinism with immunodeficiency)
- Griscelli syndrome type 3
- Hemochromatosis (bronze diabetes)
- Hemosiderin hyperpigmentation
- Hermansky–Pudlak syndrome
- Idiopathic guttate hypomelanosis (leukopathia symmetrica progressiva)
- Iron metallic discoloration
- Klein–Waardenburg syndrome
- Lead poisoning
- Leukoderma
- Melanoma-associated leukoderma
- Melasma (chloasma faciei, mask of pregnancy)
- Mukamel syndrome
- Necklace of Venus
- Nevus anemicus
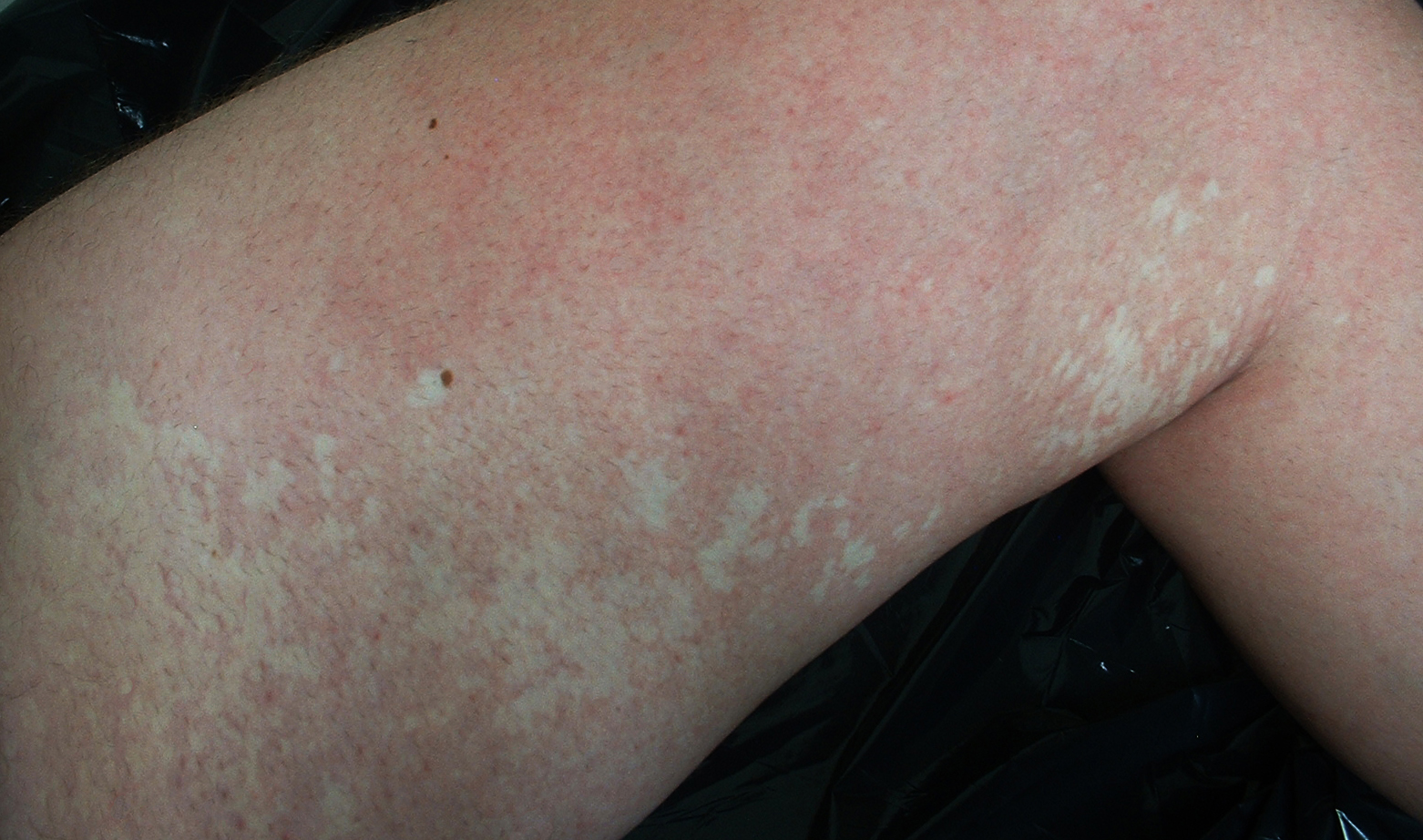
  Nevus anemicus
- Nevus depigmentosus (nevus achromicus)
- Ocular albinism
- Oculocutaneous albinism
- Pallister–Killian syndrome
- Periorbital hyperpigmentation
- Photoleukomelanodermatitis of Kobori
- Phylloid hypomelanosis
- Piebaldism
- Pigmentatio reticularis faciei et colli
- Pityriasis alba
- Poikiloderma of Civatte
- Poikiloderma vasculare atrophicans
- Postinflammatory hyperpigmentation (postinflammatory hypermelanosis)
- Postinflammatory hypopigmentation
- Progressive macular hypomelanosis
- Quadrichrome vitiligo
- Reticular pigmented anomaly of the flexures (dark dot disease, Dowling–Degos' disease)
- Reticulate acropigmentation of Kitamura
- Revesz syndrome
- Riehl melanosis
- Scratch dermatitis (flagellate pigmentation from bleomycin)
- Segmental vitiligo
- Shah–Waardenburg syndrome
- Shiitake mushroom dermatitis (flagellate mushroom dermatitis, mushroom worker's disease, shiitake-induced toxicoderma)
- Tar melanosis (melanodermatitis toxica lichenoides)
- Tietz syndrome
- Titanium metallic discoloration
- Transient neonatal pustular melanosis (transient neonatal pustulosis, lentigines neonatorum)
- Trichrome vitiligo
- Vagabond's leukomelanoderma
- Vasospastic macule
- Vitiligo
- Vitiligo ponctué
- Vogt–Koyanagi–Harada syndrome
- Waardenburg syndrome
- Wende–Bauckus syndrome (Pegum syndrome)
- Woronoff's ring
- X-linked reticulate pigmentary disorder (familial cutaneous amyloidosis, Partington amyloidosis, Partington cutaneous amyloidosis, Partington syndrome type II, reticulate pigmentary disorder, X-linked reticulate pigmentary disorder with systemic manifestations)
- Yemenite deaf-blind hypopigmentation syndrome

== Drug eruptions ==
Drug eruptions are adverse drug reactions that present with cutaneous manifestations.

- Acrodynia (calomel disease, erythredemic polyneuropathy, pink disease)
- Acute generalized exanthematous pustulosis (pustular drug eruption, toxic pustuloderma)
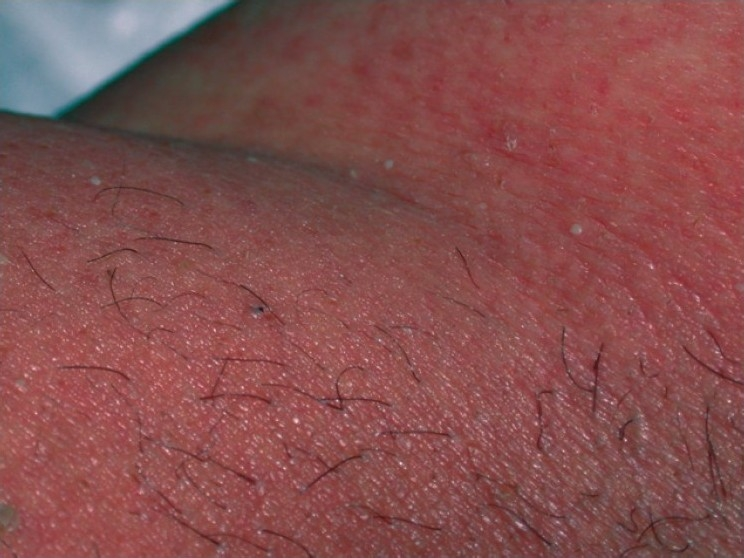
  Acute generalized exanthematous pustulosis
- Adverse reaction to biologic agents
- Adverse reaction to cytokines
- Allopurinol hypersensitivity syndrome
- Anticoagulant-induced skin necrosis
- Anticonvulsant hypersensitivity syndrome
- Bromoderma
- Bullous drug reaction (bullous drug eruption, generalized bullous fixed drug eruption, multilocular bullous fixed drug eruption)
- Chemotherapy-induced acral erythema (palmoplantar erythrodysesthesia syndrome)
- Chemotherapy-induced hyperpigmentation
- Drug-induced acne
- Drug-induced angioedema
- Drug-related gingival hyperplasia
- Drug-induced lichenoid reaction (drug-induced lichen planus, lichenoid drug eruption)
- Drug-induced lupus erythematosus
- Drug-induced nail changes
- Drug-induced pigmentation
- Drug-induced urticaria
- Drug reaction with eosinophilia and systemic symptoms
- Erythema multiforme major (erythema multiforme minor–erythema multiforme von Hebra)
- Exudative hyponychial dermatitis
- Fixed drug reaction
- Halogenoderma
- Heparin necrosis
- HIV disease-related drug reaction
- Hydroxyurea dermopathy
- Injection site reaction
- Iododerma
- Leukotriene receptor antagonist-associated Churg–Strauss syndrome
- Linear IgA bullous dermatosis (linear IgA dermatosis)
- Photosensitive drug reaction
- Red man syndrome
- Severe cutaneous adverse reactions (includes DRESS syndrome, Steven Johnson syndrome, Toxic epidermal necrolysis, Stevens-Johnson/toxic epidermal necrolysis overlap syndrome, and Acute generalized exanthematous pustulosis)
- Scleroderma-like reaction to taxanes
- Serum sickness-like reaction
- Steroid acne
- Steroid folliculitis
- Stevens–Johnson syndrome
- Sulfonamide hypersensitivity syndrome
- Texier's disease
- Toxic epidermal necrolysis (Lyell's syndrome)
- Urticarial erythema multiforme
- Vitamin K reaction
- Warfarin necrosis

== Endocrine-related ==
Endocrine conditions often present with cutaneous findings as the skin interacts with the endocrine system in many ways.

- Acanthosis nigricans associated with malignancy (acanthosis nigricans type I)
- Acanthosis nigricans associated with obesity, insulin-resistant states, and endocrinopathy (acanthosis nigricans type III)
- Acral acanthosis nigricans (acral acanthotic anomaly)
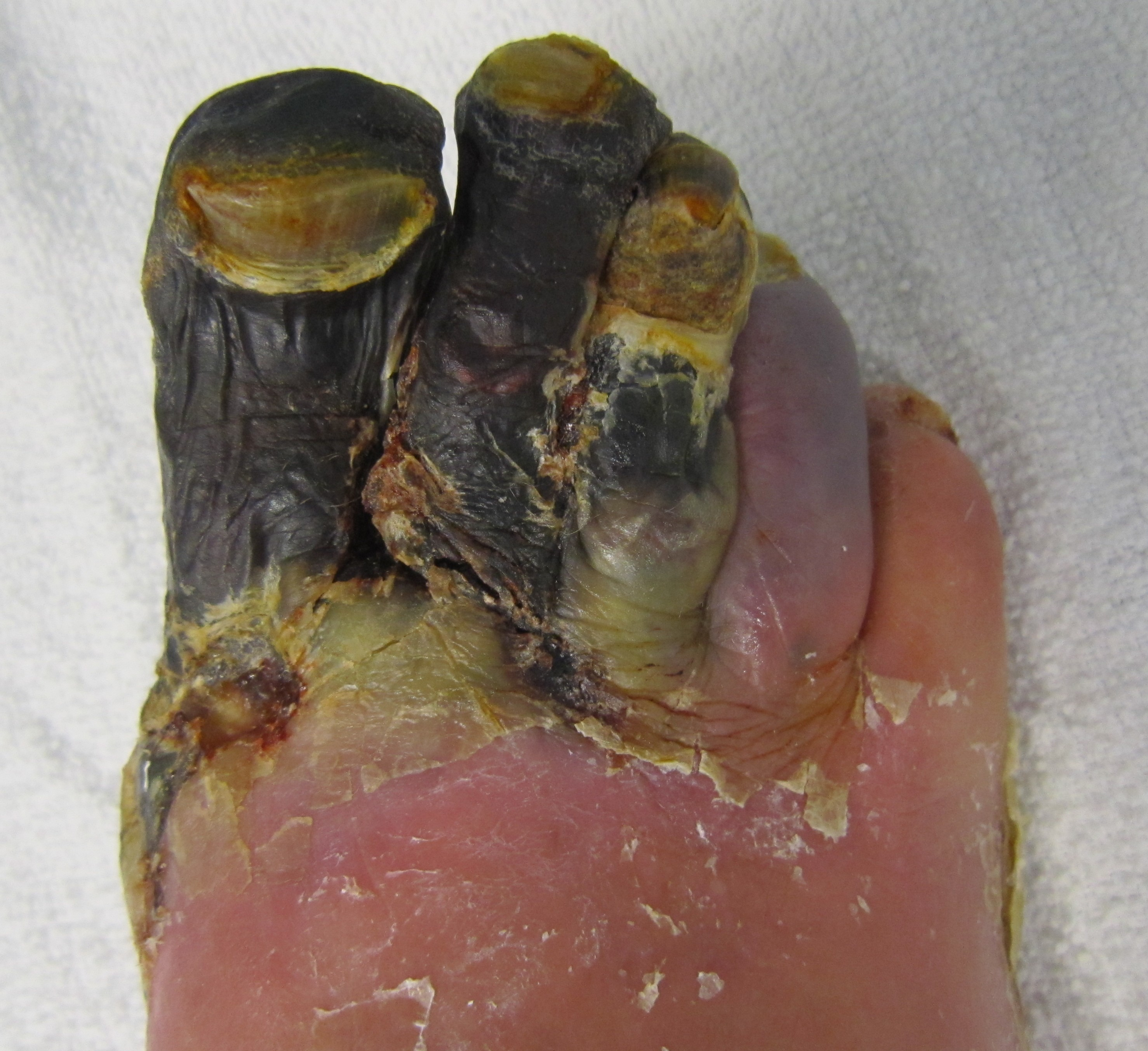
  Acral dry gangrene
- Acral dry gangrene
- Acromegaly
- Addison's disease
- Adrenal adenoma
- Adrenal carcinoma
- Adrenal hyperplasia
- Alopecia–nail dystrophy–ophthalmic complications–thyroid dysfunction–hypohidrosis–ephelides and enteropathy–respiratory tract infections syndrome (ANOTHER syndrome)
- Arrhenoblastoma
- Cretinism
- Cushing's syndrome
  Acanthosis nigricans associated with obesity, insulin-resistant states, and endocrinopathy
- Excess ovarian androgen release syndrome (ovarian SAHA syndrome)
- Familial acanthosis nigricans (acanthosis nigricans type II)
- Growth hormone deficiency
- Hyperandrogenism–insulin resistance–acanthosis nigricans syndrome (HAIR-AN syndrome)
- Hyperparathyroidism
- Hyperprolactinemic SAHA syndrome
- Hyperthyroidism
- Hypoparathyroidism
- Hypothyroidism
- Leydig cell tumor
- Multiple endocrine neoplasia type 1 (Wermer syndrome)
- Multiple endocrine neoplasia type 2 (multiple endocrine neoplasia type 2A, pheochromocytoma and amyloid-producing medullary thyroid carcinoma, PTC syndrome, Sipple syndrome)
- Multiple endocrine neoplasia type 3 (mucosal neuromata with endocrine tumors, multiple endocrine neoplasia type 2B, multiple mucosal neuroma syndrome, Wagenmann–Froboese syndrome)
- Myxedema
- Panhypopituitarism
- Persistent adrenarche syndrome (adrenal SAHA syndrome)
- Polyendocrine metabolic ovarian syndrome (PMOS)
- Seborrhoea–acne–hirsutism–alopecia (SAHA syndrome)
- Thyroid acropachy

== Eosinophilic ==
Eosinophilic cutaneous conditions encompass a wide variety of diseases that are characterized histologically by the presence of eosinophils in the inflammatory infiltrate, or evidence of eosinophil degranulation.

- Angiolymphoid hyperplasia with eosinophilia (epithelioid hemangioma, histiocytoid hemangioma, inflammatory angiomatous nodule, inflammatory arteriovenous hemangioma, intravenous atypical vascular proliferation, papular angioplasia, pseudopyogenic granuloma)
- Annular erythema of infancy
- Arthropod assault
- Eosinophilic cellulitis (Wells' syndrome)
- Eosinophilic fasciitis (Shulman's syndrome)
- Eosinophilic granuloma
- Eosinophilic granulomatosis with polyangiitis
- Eosinophilic pustular folliculitis of infancy (eosinophilic pustular folliculitis in infancy, infantile eosinophilic pustular folliculitis, neonatal eosinophilic pustular folliculitis)
- Eosinophilic ulcer of the oral mucosa (eosinophilic ulcer of the tongue, Riga–Fede disease, traumatic eosinophilic granuloma)
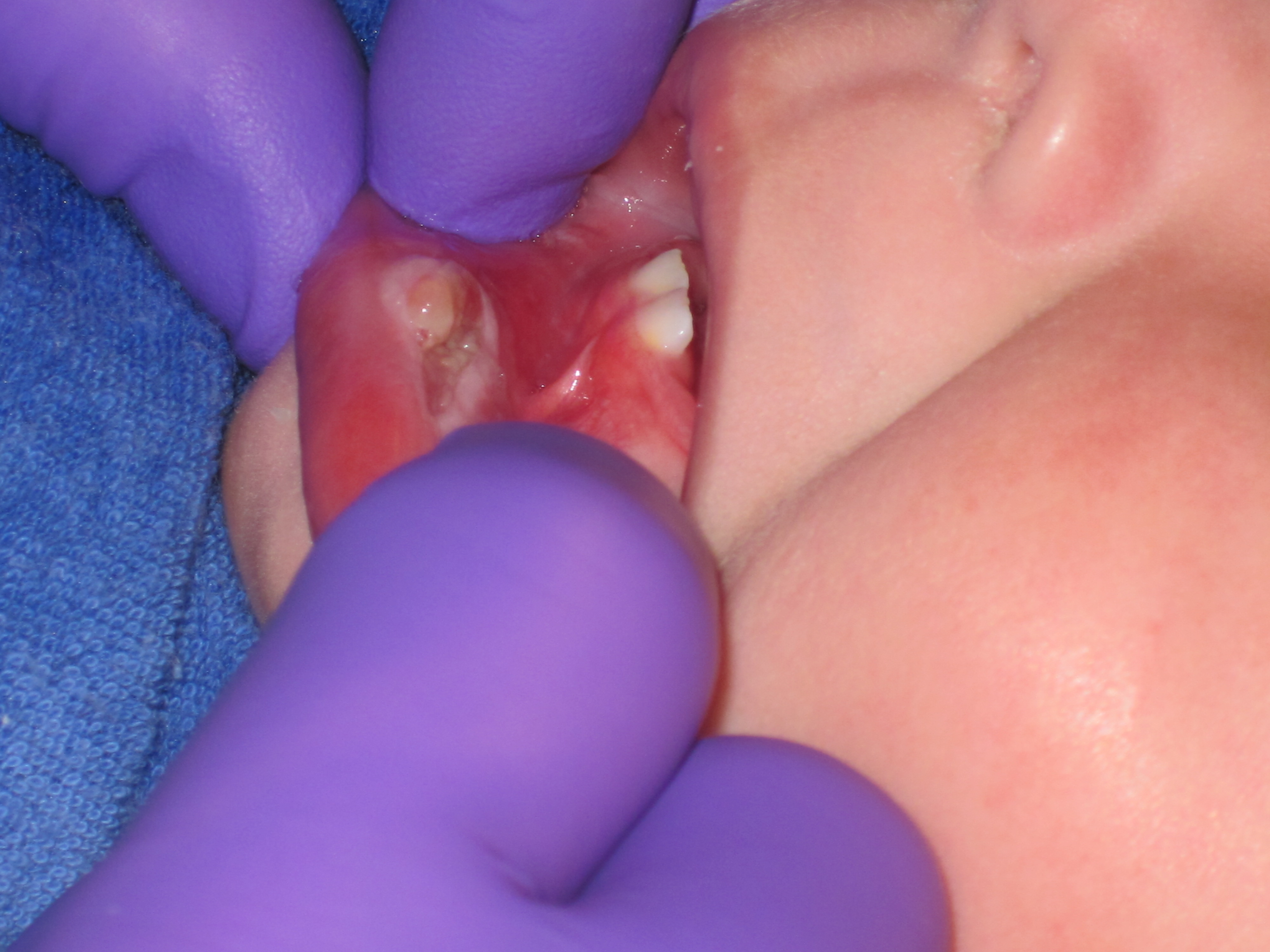
  Eosinophilic ulcer of the oral mucosa
- Eosinophilic vasculitis
- Erythema toxicum neonatorum (erythema toxicum, toxic erythema of the newborn)
- Granuloma faciale
- Hypereosinophilia
- Hypereosinophilic syndrome
- Incontinentia pigmenti (Bloch–Siemens syndrome, Bloch–Sulzberger disease, Bloch–Sulzberger syndrome)
- Itchy red bump disease (papular dermatitis)
- Juvenile xanthogranuloma
- Kimura's disease
- Nodules–eosinophilia–rheumatism–dermatitis–swelling syndrome
- Pachydermatous eosinophilic dermatitis
- Papular eruption of blacks
- Papuloerythroderma of Ofuji
- Pruritic papular eruption of HIV disease

== Epidermal nevi, neoplasms, and cysts ==
Epidermal nevi, neoplasms, and cysts are skin lesions that develop from the epidermal layer of the skin.

- Aberrant basal cell carcinoma
- Acanthoma fissuratum (granuloma fissuratum, spectacle frame acanthoma)
- Acrospiroma (clear cell hidradenoma, dermal duct tumor, hidroacanthoma simplex, nodular hidradenoma, poroma)
- Actinic keratosis (senile keratosis, solar keratosis)
- Adenoid squamous cell carcinoma (pseudoglandular squamous cell carcinoma)
- Aggressive digital papillary adenocarcinoma (digital papillary adenocarcinoma, papillary adenoma)
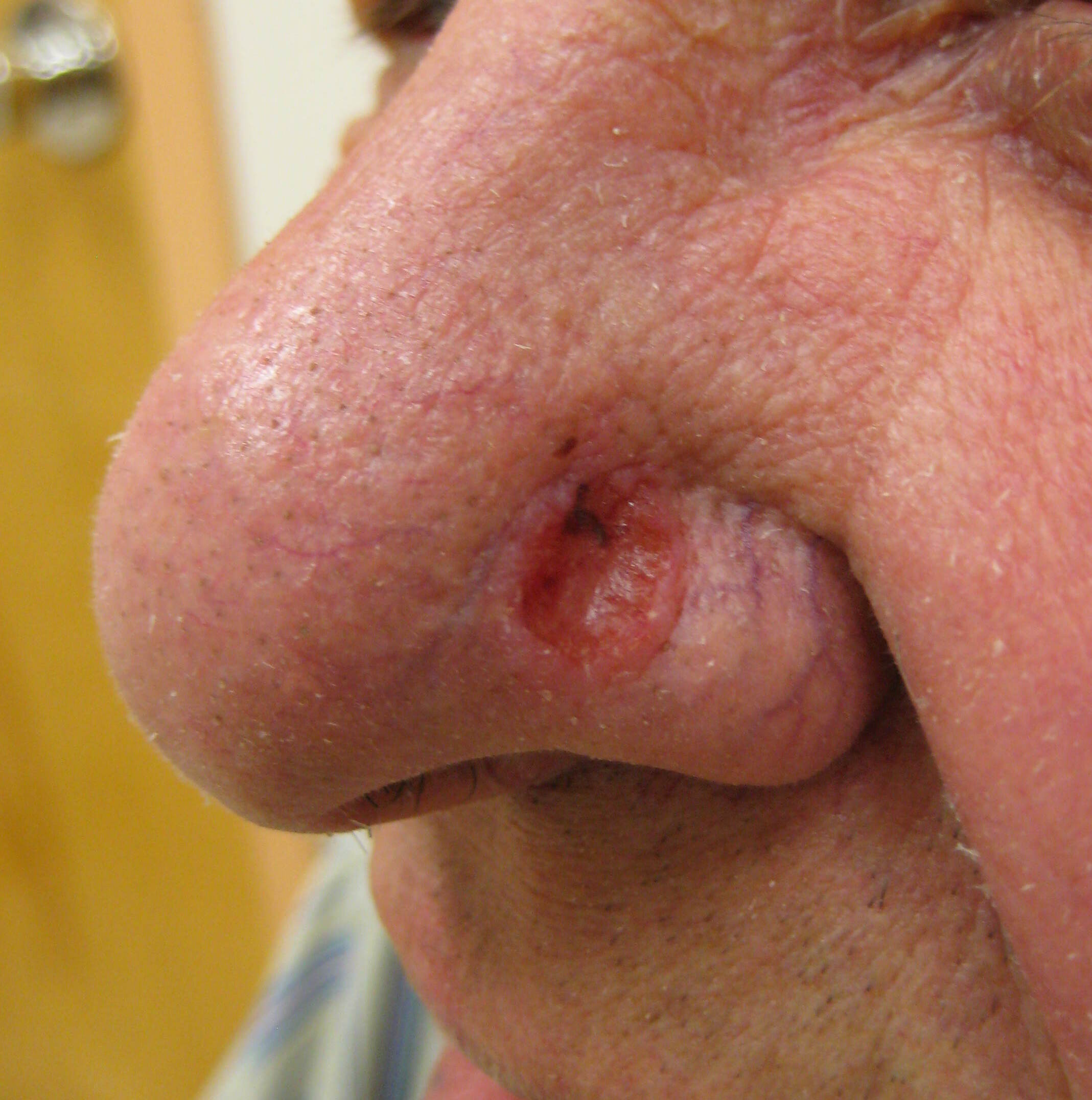
  Basal cell carcinoma
- Apocrine gland carcinoma
- Apocrine nevus
- Arsenical keratosis
- Atrophic actinic keratosis
- Balanitis plasmacellularis (balanoposthitis chronica circumscripta plasmacellularis, balanitis circumscripta plasmacellularis, plasma cell balanitis, plasma cell vulvitis, vulvitis circumscripta plasmacellularis, Zoon's balanitis, Zoon's erythroplasia, Zoon's vulvitis)
- Basal cell carcinoma
- Basaloid follicular hamartoma
- Basaloid squamous cell carcinoma
- Birt–Hogg–Dubé syndrome
- Bowen's disease (squamous cell carcinoma in situ)
- Brooke–Fordyce syndrome
- Ceruminoma
- Cicatricial basal cell carcinoma (morpheaform basal cell carcinoma, morphoeic basal cell carcinoma)
- Ciliated cyst of the vulva (cutaneous Müllerian cyst, paramesonephric mucinous cyst of the vulva)
- Clear cell acanthoma (acanthome cellules claires of Degos and Civatte, Degos acanthoma, pale cell acanthoma)
- Clear cell squamous cell carcinoma (clear cell carcinoma of the skin)
- Chronic scar keratosis (chronic cicatrix keratosis)
- Clonal seborrheic keratosis
- Common seborrheic keratosis (basal cell papilloma, solid seborrheic keratosis)
- Cowden syndrome (Cowden's disease, multiple hamartoma syndrome)
- Cutaneous ciliated cyst
- Cutaneous columnar cyst
- Cutaneous horn (Cornu cutaneum)
- Cystic basal cell carcinoma
- Dermal eccrine cylindroma (cylindroma)
- Dermatosis papulosa nigra
- Desmoplastic trichoepithelioma
- Dilated pore (dilated pore of Winer)
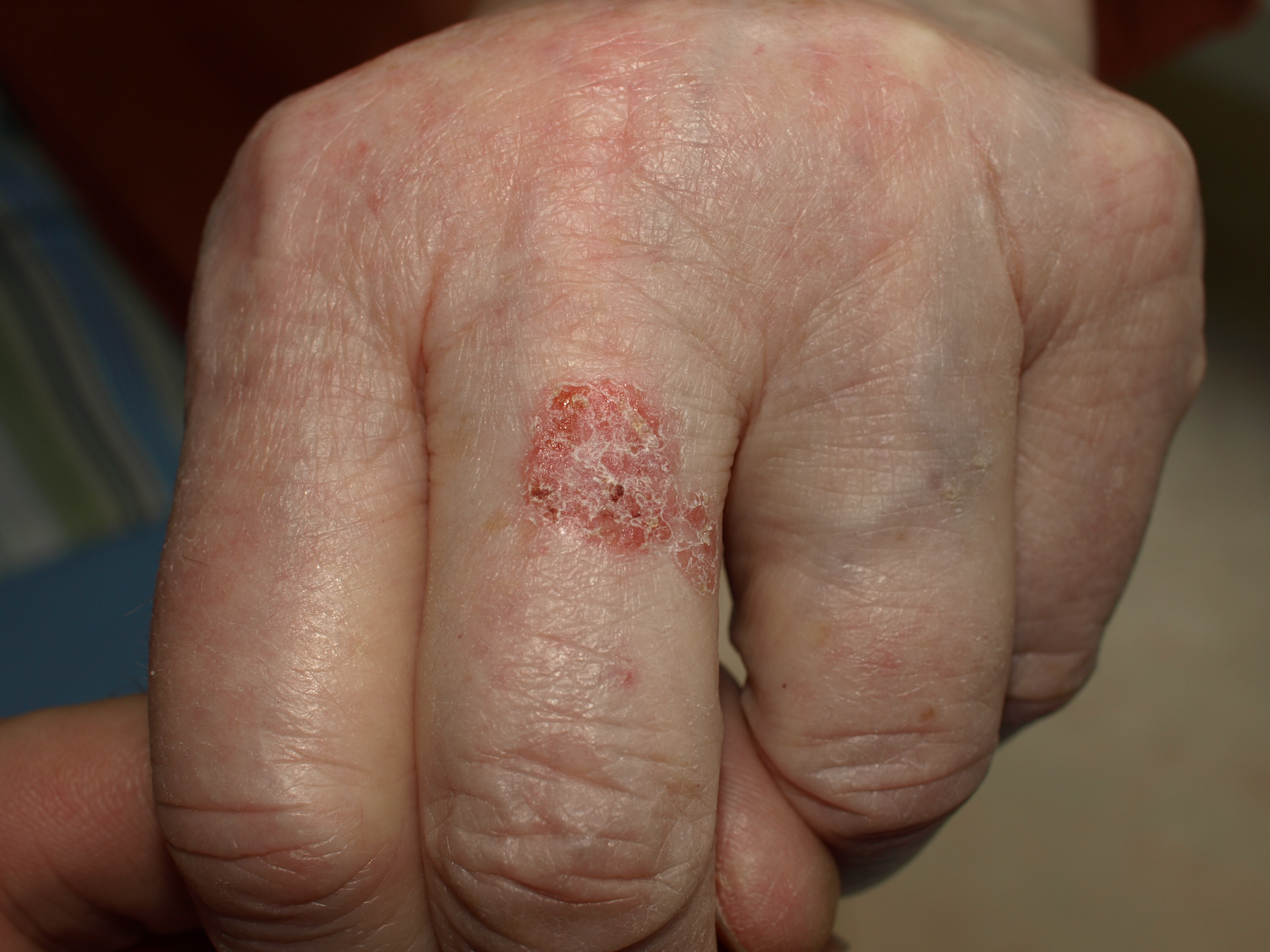
  Bowen's disease
- Eccrine carcinoma (syringoid carcinoma)
- Eccrine nevus
- Epidermal cyst (epidermal inclusion cyst, epidermoid cyst, infundibular cyst, keratin cyst)
- Epidermal nevus syndrome (Feuerstein and Mims syndrome, Solomon's syndrome)
- Epidermolytic acanthoma
- Epithelioma cuniculatum (Ackerman tumor, carcinoma cuniculatum)
- Eruptive vellus hair cyst
- Erythroplasia of Queyrat
- Extramammary Paget's disease
- Fibroepithelioma
- Fibroepithelioma of Pinkus
- Fibrofolliculoma
- Follicular hybrid cyst (Hybrid cyst)
- Folliculosebaceous-apocrine hamartoma (follicular-apocrine hamartoma)
- Folliculosebaceous cystic hamartoma
- Generalized eruptive keratoacanthoma (generalized eruptive keratoacanthoma of Grzybowski)
- Giant solitary trichoepithelioma
- Hidradenoma
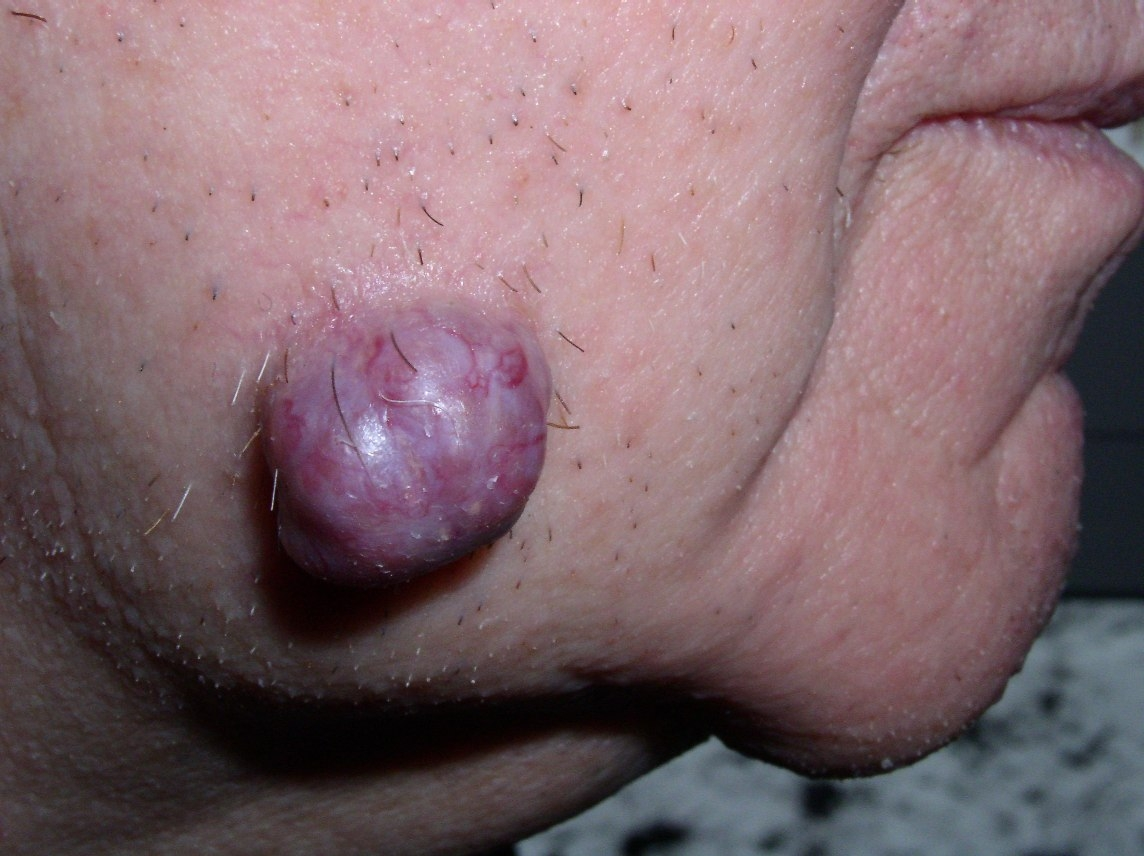
  Hidradenoma
- Hidradenocarcinoma
- Hidrocystoma (cystadenoma, Moll's gland cyst, sudoriferous cyst)
- Hydrocarbon keratosis (pitch keratosis, tar keratosis, tar wart)
- Hyperkeratosis lenticularis perstans (Flegel's disease)
- Hyperkeratosis of the nipple and areola
- Hyperkeratotic actinic keratosis
- Ichthyosis hystrix (ichthyosis hystrix gravior type Lambert, porcupine man, systematized verrucous nevus)
- Ichthyosis hystrix of Curth–Macklin
- Infiltrative basal cell carcinoma
- Inflammatory linear verrucous epidermal nevus
- Inverted follicular keratosis
- Irritated seborrheic keratosis (basosquamous cell acanthoma, inflamed seborrheic keratosis)
- Isthmicoma (infundibuloma, tumor of the follicular infundibulum)
- Juvenile myelomonocytic leukemia
- Keratin implantation cyst
- Keratoacanthoma
- Keratoacanthoma centrifugum marginatum
- Large cell acanthoma
- Lichenoid actinic keratosis
- Lichenoid keratosis (benign lichenoid keratosis, lichen planus-like keratosis, solitary lichen planus, solitary lichenoid keratosis)
- Linear verrucous epidermal nevus (linear epidermal nevus, verrucous epidermal nevus)
- Malignant acrospiroma (spiradenocarcinoma)
- Malignant mixed tumor (malignant chondroid syringoma)
- Malignant trichilemmal cyst
- Mantleoma
- Marjolin's ulcer
- Melanoacanthoma (pigmented seborrheic keratosis)
- Merkel cell carcinoma (cutaneous apudoma, primary neuroendocrine carcinoma of the skin, primary small cell carcinoma of the skin, trabecular carcinoma of the skin)
- Microcystic adnexal carcinoma (sclerosing sweat duct carcinoma)
- Micronodular basal cell carcinoma
- Milia en plaque
- Milium
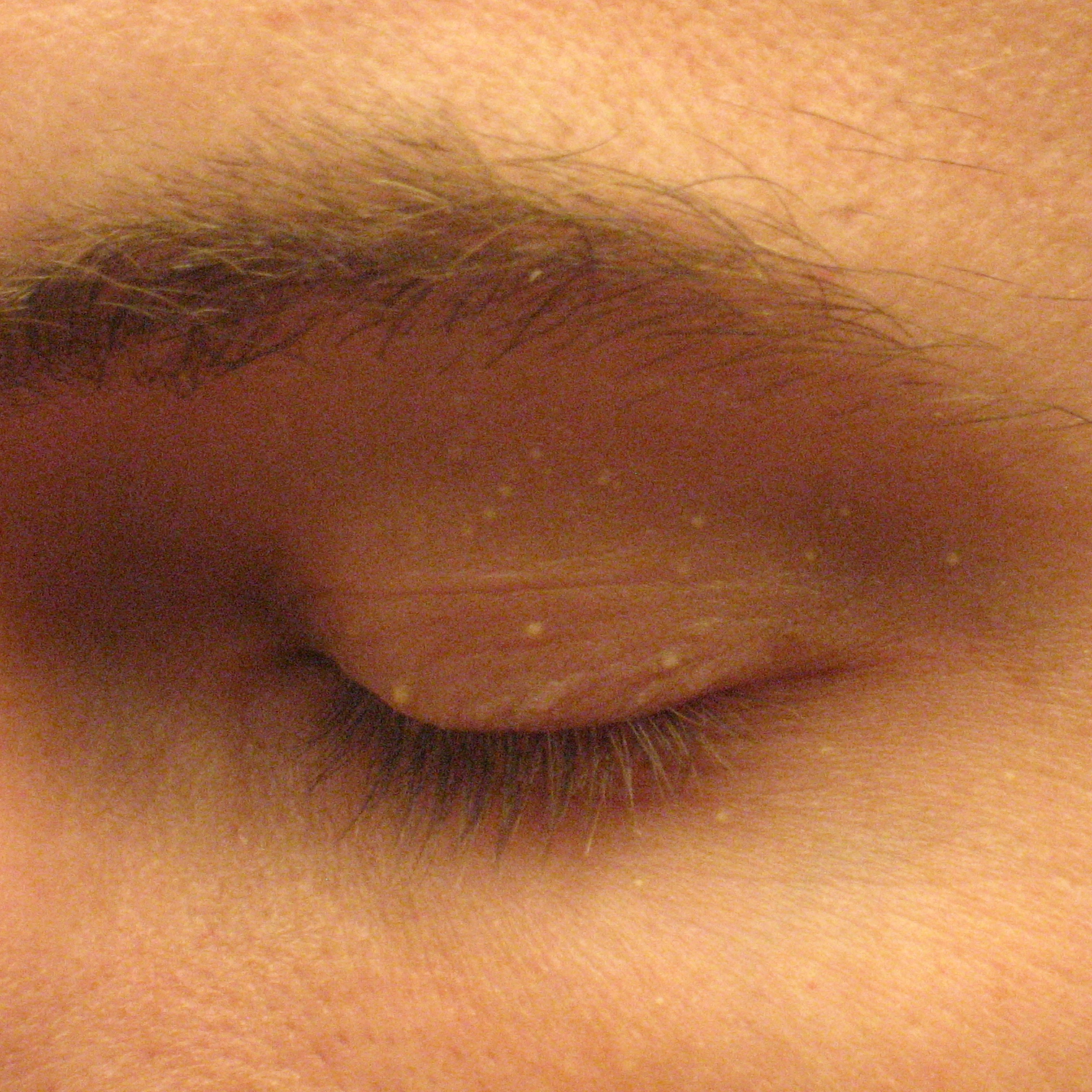
  Milium
- Mixed tumor (chondroid syringoma)
- Mucinous carcinoma
- Mucinous nevus (nevus mucinosus)
- Muir–Torre syndrome
- Multiple familial trichoepithelioma (Brooke–Spiegler syndrome, epithelioma adenoides cysticum)
- Multiple keratoacanthomas (Ferguson–Smith syndrome, Ferguson-Smith type of multiple self-healing keratoacanthomas, multiple keratoacanthomas of the Ferguson–Smith type)
- Multiple minute digitate hyperkeratosis (digitate keratoses, disseminated spiked hyperkeratosis, familial disseminated piliform hyperkeratosis, minute aggregate keratosis)
- Nevoid basal cell carcinoma syndrome (basal cell nevus syndrome, Gorlin syndrome, Gorlin–Goltz syndrome)
- Nevus comedonicus (comedo nevus)
- Nevus comedonicus syndrome
- Nevus sebaceous (nevus sebaceous of Jadassohn, organoid nevus)
- Nevus unius lateris
- Nodular basal cell carcinoma (classic basal cell carcinoma)
- Paget's disease of the breast
- Papillary eccrine adenoma (tubular apocrine adenoma)
- Papillary hidradenoma (hidradenoma papilliferum)
- Papillomatosis cutis carcinoides (Gottron's carcinoid papillomatosis, papillomatosis cutis carcinoides of Gottron–Eisenlohr)
- Patch blue nevus (acquired dermal melanocytosis, dermal melanocyte hamartoma)
- Perifollicular fibroma
- Phakomatosis pigmentokeratotica
- Pigmented actinic keratosis
- Pigmented basal cell carcinoma
- Pigmented hairy epidermal nevus syndrome
- Pilar sheath acanthoma
- Pilonidal sinus (Barber's interdigital pilonidal sinus, pilonidal cyst, pilonidal disease)
- Porocarcinoma (malignant poroma, eccrine porocarcinoma)
- Polypoid basal cell carcinoma
- Pore-like basal cell carcinoma
- Primary cutaneous adenoid cystic carcinoma
- Proliferating epidermoid cyst (proliferating epithelial cyst)
- Proliferating trichilemmal cyst (pilar tumor, proliferating follicular cystic neoplasm, proliferating pilar tumor, proliferating trichilemmal tumor)
- Pseudocyst of the auricle (auricular endochondrial pseudocyst, cystic chondromalacia, endochondral pseudocyst, intracartilaginous cyst)
- Pseudoepitheliomatous keratotic and micaceous balanitis
- PUVA keratosis
- Rasmussen syndrome
- Reactional keratosis
- Reticulated seborrheic keratosis (adenoid seborrheic keratosis)
- Rodent ulcer (Jacobi ulcer)
- Schimmelpenning syndrome (Schimmelpenning–Feuerstein–Mims syndrome)
- Sebaceoma (sebaceous epithelioma)
- Sebaceous adenoma
- Sebaceous carcinoma
- Sebaceous hyperplasia
- Sebaceous nevus syndrome
- Seboacanthoma
- Seborrheic keratosis (seborrheic verruca, senile wart)
- Seborrheic keratosis with squamous atypia
- Signet-ring cell squamous cell carcinoma
- Solitary keratoacanthoma (subungual keratoacanthoma)
- Solitary trichoepithelioma
- Spindle cell squamous cell carcinoma (spindle cell carcinoma)
- Spiradenoma
- Squamous cell carcinoma
  Squamous cell carcinoma
- Steatocystoma multiplex (epidermal polycystic disease, sebocystomatosis)
- Steatocystoma simplex (simple sebaceous duct cyst, solitary steatocystoma)
- Stucco keratosis (digitate seborrheic keratosis, hyperkeratotic seborrheic keratosis, keratosis alba, serrated seborrheic keratosis, verrucous seborrheic keratosis)
- Superficial basal cell carcinoma (superficial multicentric basal cell carcinoma)
- Syringadenoma papilliferum (syringocystadenoma papilliferum)
- Syringofibroadenoma (acrosyringeal nevus of Weedon and Lewis)
- Syringoma
- Systematized epidermal nevus
- Thermal keratosis
- Trichilemmal carcinoma
- Trichilemmal cyst (isthmus-catagen cyst, pilar cyst)
- Trichilemmoma
- Trichoadenoma (trichoadenoma of Nikolowski)
- Trichoblastoma
- Trichoblastic fibroma
- Trichodiscoma
- Trichofolliculoma
- Unilateral palmoplantar verrucous nevus
- Urethral caruncle
- Verrucous carcinoma
- Verrucous cyst (cystic papilloma)
- Viral keratosis
- Warty dyskeratoma (isolated dyskeratosis follicularis)
- Waxy keratosis of childhood (kerinokeratosis papulosa)
- Zoon's vulvitis
- Zosteriform speckled lentiginous nevus

== Erythemas ==
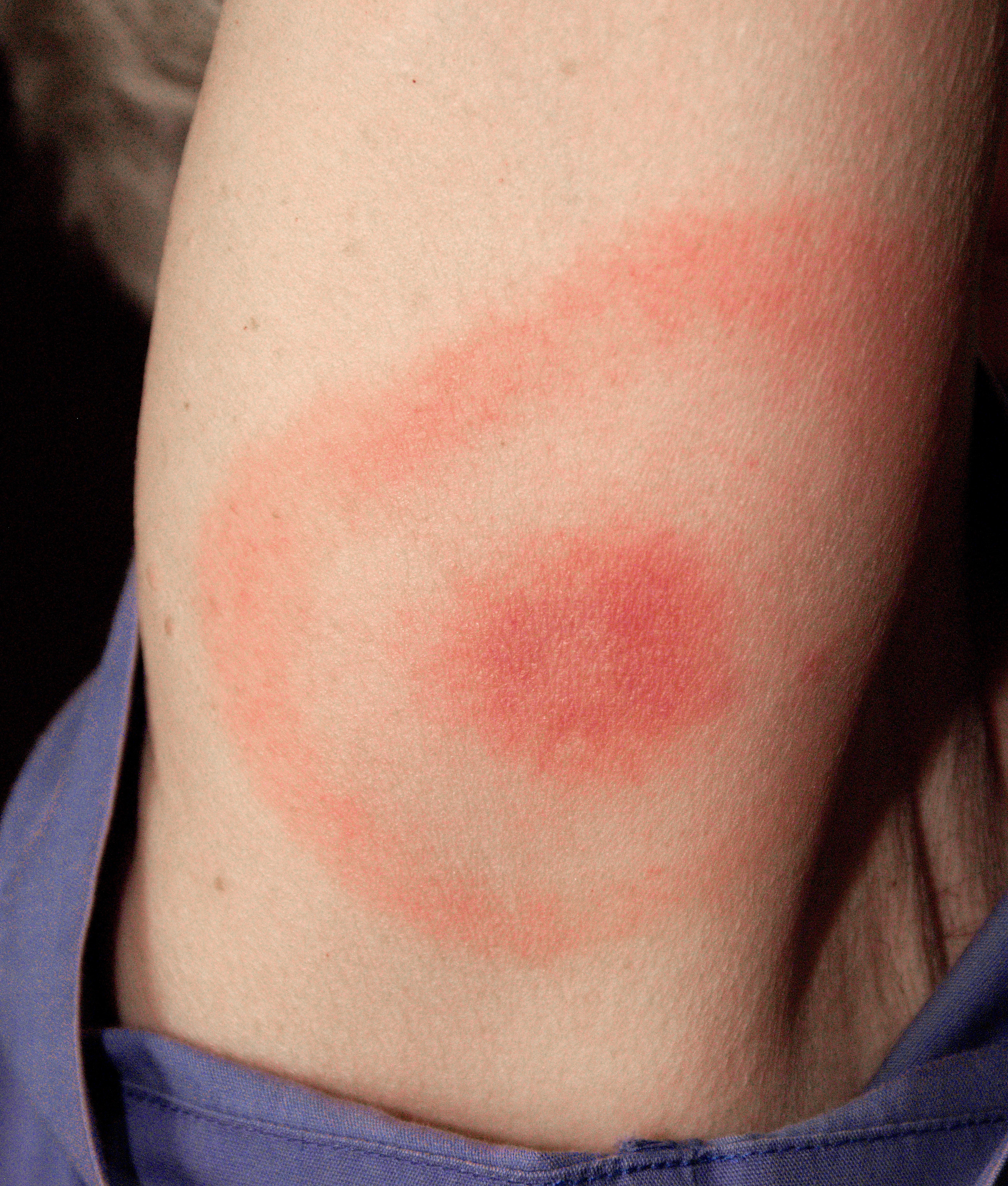
Erythema migrans

Erythemas are reactive skin conditions in which there is blanchable redness.

- Erythema annulare centrifugum (deep gyrate erythema, erythema perstans, palpable migrating erythema, superficial gyrate erythema)
- Erythema gyratum repens (Gammel's disease)
- Erythema migrans (erythema chronicum migrans)
- Erythema multiforme
- Erythema multiforme minor (herpes simplex-associated erythema multiforme)
- Erythema palmare
- Generalized erythema
- Necrolytic acral erythema
- Necrolytic migratory erythema (glucagonoma syndrome)

== Genodermatoses ==
Genodermatoses are inherited genetic skin conditions often grouped into three categories: chromosomal, single gene, and polygenetic.

- 18q deletion syndrome
- Acrodermatitis enteropathica
- Acrogeria (Gottron syndrome)
- Acrokeratosis verruciformis (acrokeratosis verruciformis of Hopf)
- Adams–Oliver syndrome
- Adducted thumbs syndrome
- Albright's hereditary osteodystrophy
- Angelman syndrome
- Apert syndrome (acrocephalosyndactyly)
- Arthrogryposis–renal dysfunction–cholestasis syndrome
- Ataxia telangiectasia (Louis–Bar syndrome)
- Atrichia with papular lesions (papular atrichia)
- Atrophodermia vermiculata (acne vermoulante, acne vermoulanti, atrophoderma reticulata symmetrica faciei, atrophoderma reticulatum, atrophoderma vermiculata, atrophoderma vermiculatum, atrophodermia reticulata symmetrica faciei, atrophodermia ulerythematosa, atrophodermie vermiculée des joues avec kératoses folliculaires, folliculitis ulerythema reticulata, folliculitis ulerythematous reticulata, folliculitis ulerythemosa, honeycomb atrophy, ulerythema acneforme, ulerythema acneiforme)
- Autoimmune polyendocrinopathy–candidiasis–ectodermal dystrophy syndrome
- Bart syndrome
- Bazex–Dupré–Christol syndrome (Bazex syndrome, follicular atrophoderma and basal cell carcinomas)
- Beare–Stevenson cutis gyrata syndrome
- Bloom syndrome (Bloom–Torre–Machacek syndrome)
- Blue rubber bleb nevus syndrome
- Brittle hair–intellectual impairment–decreased fertility–short stature syndrome
- Cantú syndrome
- Cardio-facio-cutaneous syndrome (cardiofaciocutaneous syndrome)
- Cartilage–hair hypoplasia (McKusick type metaphyseal chondrodysplasia)
- Cerebral dysgenesis–neuropathy–ichthyosis–keratoderma syndrome
- Childhood tumor syndrome
- Chondrodysplasia punctata
- Cicatricial junctional epidermolysis bullosa
- Craniosynostosis–anal anomalies–porokeratosis syndrome
- Cockayne syndrome
- Colobomas of the eye–heart defects–ichthyosiform dermatosis–mental retardation–ear defects syndrome (CHIME syndrome, Zunich neuroectodermal syndrome, Zunich–Kaye syndrome)
- Congenital hemidysplasia with ichthyosiform erythroderma and limb defects syndrome (CHILD syndrome)
- Conradi–Hünermann syndrome (Conradi–Hünermann–Happle syndrome, Happle syndrome, X-linked dominant chondrodysplasia punctata)
- Costello syndrome
- Cronkhite–Canada syndrome
- Crouzon syndrome
- Cutis verticis gyrata
- Darier's disease (Darier–White disease, dyskeratosis follicularis, keratosis follicularis)
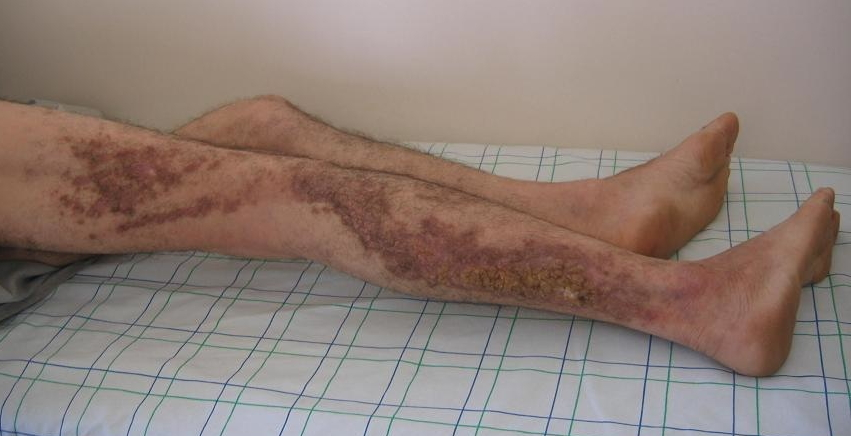
  Linear Darier disease
- DeSanctis–Cacchione syndrome
- Disseminated superficial actinic porokeratosis
- Disseminated superficial porokeratosis
- Dolichol kinase deficiency
- Dominant dystrophic epidermolysis bullosa
- Dyskeratosis congenita (Zinsser–Cole–Engman syndrome)
- Dystrophic epidermolysis bullosa
- Ectodermal dysplasia
- Ectodermal dysplasia with corkscrew hairs
- Ectrodactyly–ectodermal dysplasia–cleft syndrome (EEC syndrome, split hand–split foot–ectodermal dysplasia–cleft syndrome)
- Epidermolysis bullosa herpetiformis (Dowling–Meara epidermolysis bullosa simplex)
- Epidermolysis bullosa simplex
- Epidermolysis bullosa simplex of Ogna
- Epidermolysis bullosa simplex with mottled pigmentation
- Epidermolysis bullosa simplex with muscular dystrophy
- Epidermolytic hyperkeratosis (bullous congenital ichthyosiform erythroderma, bullous ichthyosiform erythroderma)
- Erythrokeratodermia with ataxia (Giroux–Barbeau syndrome)
- Familial benign chronic pemphigus (familial benign pemphigus, Hailey–Hailey disease)
- Fanconi syndrome (familial pancytopenia, familial panmyelophthisis)
- Fibrodysplasia ossificans progressiva
- Focal dermal hypoplasia (Goltz syndrome)
- Follicular atrophoderma
- Franceschetti–Klein syndrome (mandibulofacial dysostosis)
- Gardner's syndrome (familial colorectal polyposis)
- Gastrocutaneous syndrome
- Generalized atrophic benign epidermolysis bullosa
- Generalized epidermolysis bullosa simplex (Koebner variant of generalized epidermolysis bullosa simplex)
- Generalized trichoepithelioma
- Giant axonal neuropathy with curly hair
- Gingival fibromatosis with hypertrichosis
- Haber syndrome
- Hallerman–Streiff syndrome
- Harlequin-type ichthyosis (harlequin baby, harlequin fetus, harlequin ichthyosis, ichthyosis congenita, ichthyosis congenita gravior)
- Hay–Wells syndrome (AEC syndrome, ankyloblepharon filiforme adnatum–ectodermal dysplasia–cleft palate syndrome, ankyloblepharon–ectodermal defects–cleft lip and palate syndrome, ankyloblepharon–ectodermal dysplasia–clefting syndrome)
- Hereditary sclerosing poikiloderma
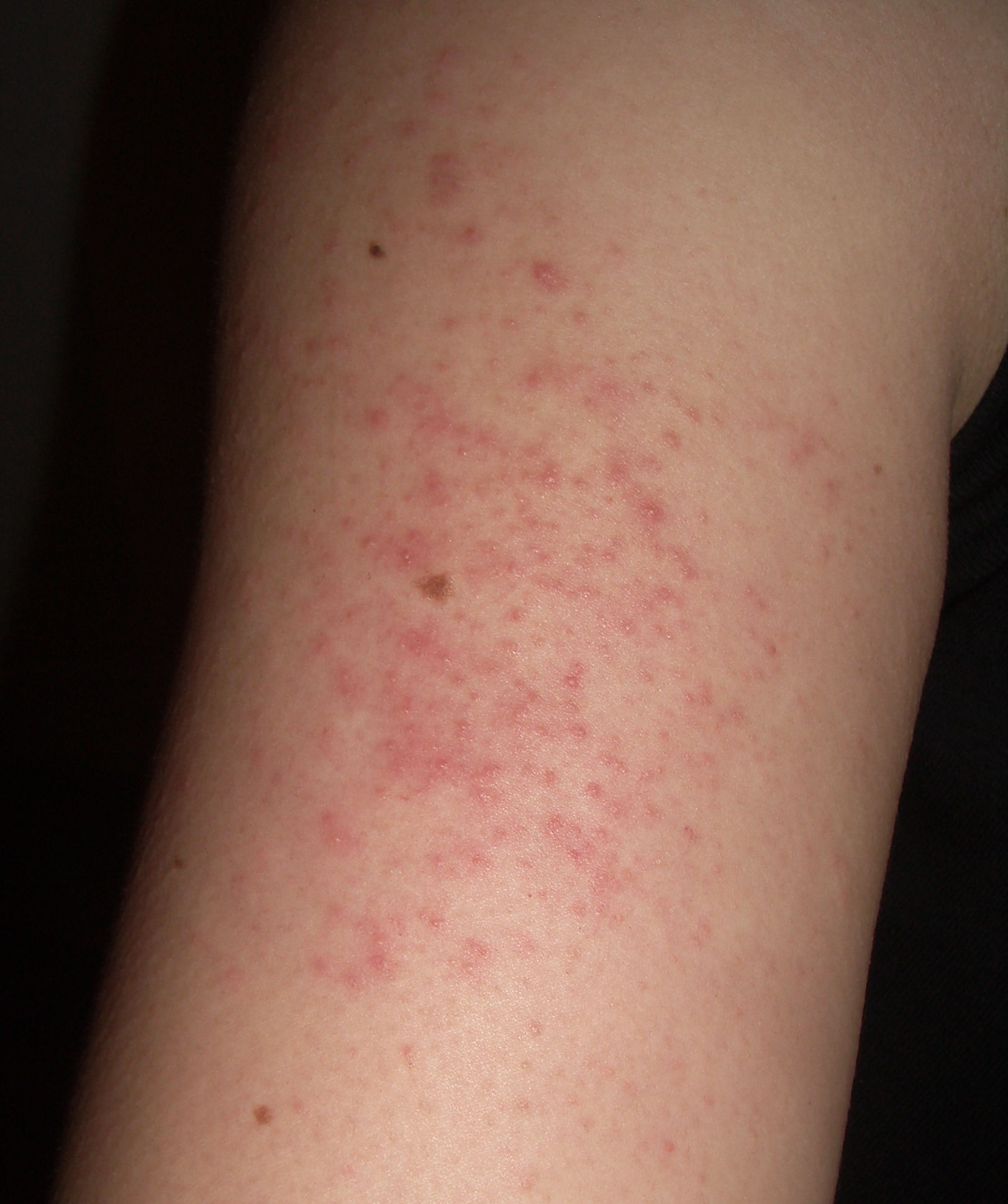
  Keratosis pilaris
- Heterochromia iridum
- Holocarboxylase synthetase deficiency
- Hypohidrotic ectodermal dysplasia (anhidrotic ectodermal dysplasia, Christ–Siemens–Touraine syndrome)
- Hypotrichosis–acro-osteolysis–onychogryphosis–palmoplantar keratoderma–periodontitis syndrome
- Hypotrichosis–lymphedema–telangiectasia syndrome
- Ichthyosis–brittle hair–impaired intelligence–decreased fertility–short stature syndrome (IBIDS syndrome, sulfur-deficient brittle hair syndrome, Tay's syndrome, trichothiodystrophy, trichothiodystrophy with ichthyosis)
- Ichthyosis bullosa of Siemens (ichthyosis exfoliativa)
- Ichthyosis follicularis (ichthyosis follicularis with alopecia and photophobia syndrome)
- Ichthyosis linearis circumflexa
- Ichthyosis prematurity syndrome
- Ichthyosis vulgaris (autosomal dominant ichthyosis, ichthyosis simplex)
- Ichthyosis with confetti
- Neonatal ichthyosis–sclerosing cholangitis syndrome (ichthyosis–sclerosing cholangitis syndrome, NISCH syndrome)
- Incontinentia pigmenti achromians (hypomelanosis of Ito)
- Immune dysfunction–polyendocrinopathy–enteropathy–X-linked syndrome
- Jaffe–Campanacci syndrome
- Johanson–Blizzard syndrome
- Johnson–McMillin syndrome
- Joubert syndrome
- Junctional epidermolysis bullosa
- Junctional epidermolysis bullosa gravis (epidermolysis bullosa letalis, Herlitz disease, Herlitz epidermolysis bullosa, Herlitz syndrome, lethal junctional epidermolysis bullosa)
- Junctional epidermolysis bullosa with pyloric atresia
- Kabuki syndrome (Kabuki makeup syndrome, Niikawa–Kuroki syndrome)
- Keratolytic winter erythema (erythrokeratolysis hiemalis, Oudtshoorn disease, Oudtshoorn skin)
- Keratosis follicularis spinulosa decalvans (Siemens-1 syndrome)
- Keratosis linearis with ichthyosis congenita and sclerosing keratoderma syndrome
- Keratosis pilaris atrophicans faciei (folliculitis rubra, keratosis pilaris rubra atrophicans faciei, lichen pilare, lichen pilaire ou xerodermie pilaire symmetrique de la face, ulerythema ophryogenes, xerodermi pilaire symmetrique de la face)
- Keratosis pilaris
- Kindler syndrome (acrokeratotic poikiloderma, bullous acrokeratotic poikiloderma of Kindler and Weary, congenital poikiloderma with blisters and keratoses, congenital poikiloderma with bullae and progressive cutaneous atrophy, hereditary acrokeratotic poikiloderma, hyperkeratosis–hyperpigmentation syndrome, Weary–Kindler syndrome)
- Klinefelter syndrome
- Klippel–Feil syndrome
- Lamellar ichthyosis (collodion baby)
- Legius syndrome (neurofibromatosis type 1-like syndrome)
- Lelis syndrome
- Lenz–Majewski syndrome
- Leschke syndrome
- Lethal acantholytic epidermolysis bullosa
- Lhermitte–Duclos disease
- Linear and whorled nevoid hypermelanosis (linear nevoid hyperpigmentation, progressive cribriform and zosteriform hyperpigmentation, reticulate and zosteriform hyperpigmentation, reticulate hyperpigmentation of Iijima and Naito and Uyeno, zebra-like hyperpigmentation in whorls and streaks, zebra-line hyperpigmentation)
- Linear Darier disease (acantholytic dyskeratotic epidermal nevus)
- Linear porokeratosis
- Localized epidermolysis bullosa simplex (Weber–Cockayne syndrome, Weber–Cockayne variant of generalized epidermolysis bullosa simplex)
- Mandibuloacral dysplasia
- Marinesco–Sjögren syndrome
- McCune–Albright syndrome
- McCusick syndrome
- Metageria
- Microphthalmia–dermal aplasia–sclerocornea syndrome
- Mitis junctional epidermolysis bullosa (nonlethal junctional epidermolysis bullosa)
- Mitochondrial myopathy–encephalopathy–lactic acidosis–stroke syndrome
- Multiple lentigines syndrome (cardiocutaneous syndrome, Gorlin syndrome II, lentiginosis profusa syndrome, LEOPARD syndrome, progressive cardiomyopathic lentiginosis)
- Multiple pterygium syndrome
- Multiple sulfatase deficiency (Austin disease, mucosulfatidosis)
- Naegeli–Franceschetti–Jadassohn syndrome (chromatophore nevus of Naegeli)
- Netherton syndrome
- Neurofibromatosis type 1 (von Recklinghausen's disease)
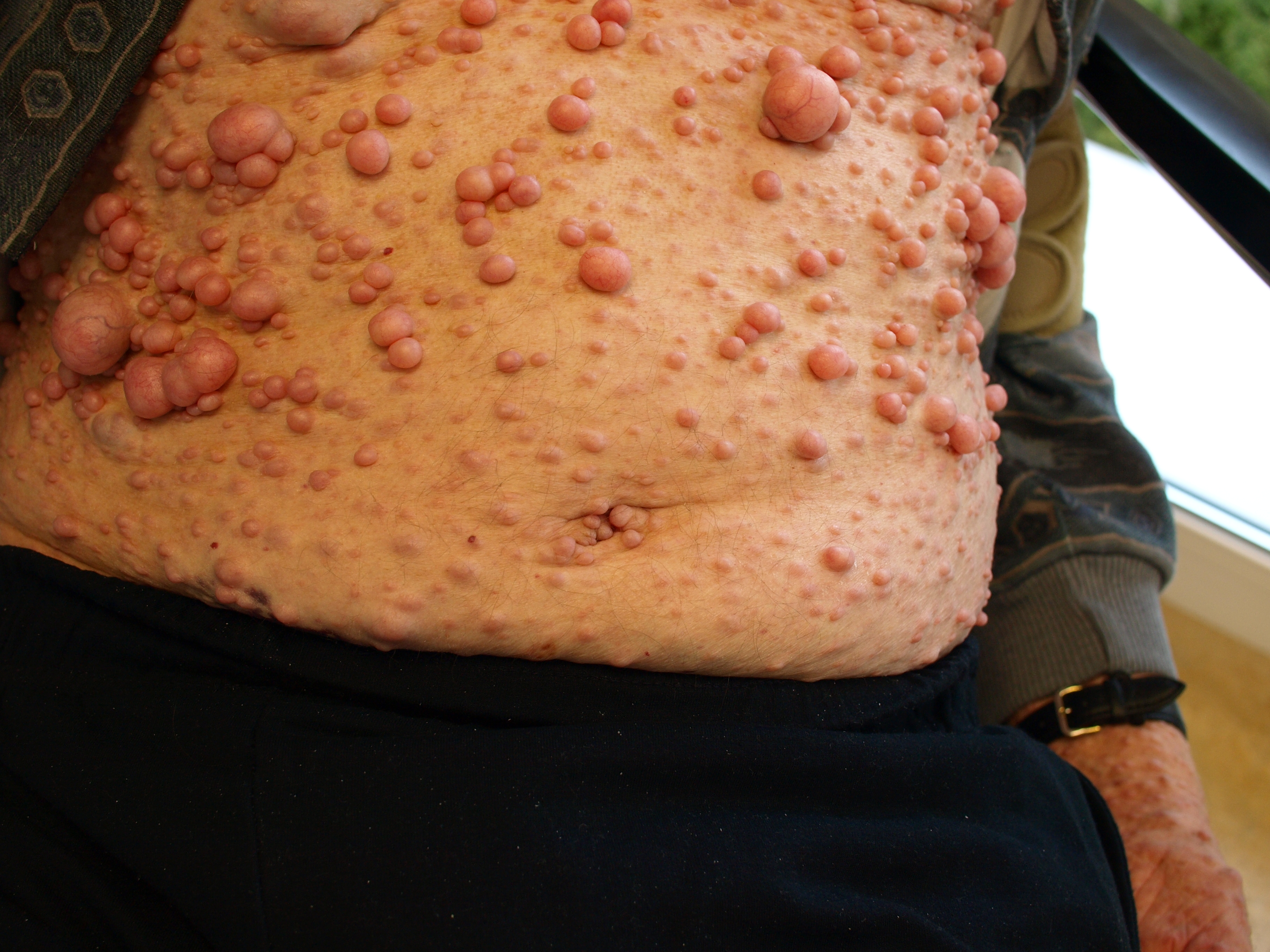
  Neurofibromatosis type 1
- Neurofibromatosis type 3 (neurofibromatosis mixed type)
- Neurofibromatosis type 4 (neurofibromatosis variant type)
- Neutral lipid storage disease (Dorfman–Chanarin syndrome)
- Nonbullous congenital ichthyosiform erythroderma (congenital ichthyosiform erythroderma)
- Noonan syndrome
- Oculocerebrocutaneous syndrome (Delleman–Oorthuys syndrome)
- Oculodentodigital dysplasia
- Odonto-tricho-ungual-digital-palmar syndrome
- Oliver–McFarlane syndrome
- Orofaciodigital syndrome
- Pachydermoperiostosis (idiopathic hypertrophic osteoathorpathy, Touraine–Solente–Gole syndrome)
- Peeling skin syndrome (acral peeling skin syndrome, continual peeling skin syndrome, familial continual skin peeling, idiopathic deciduous skin, keratolysis exfoliativa congenita)
- Pfeiffer syndrome
- Photosensitivity–ichthyosis–brittle sulfur-deficient hair–impaired intelligence–decreased fertility–short stature syndrome
- Pityriasis rotunda (pityriasis circinata, tinea circinata)
- Plate-like osteoma cutis
- Plaque-type porokeratosis (classic porokeratosis, porokeratosis of Mibelli)
- Polyneuropathy–organomegaly–endocrinopathy–monoclonal gammopathy–skin changes syndrome (Crow–Fukase syndrome)
- Polyostotic fibrous dysplasia (Albright's disease)
- Popliteal pterygium syndrome
- Porokeratosis
- Porokeratosis palmaris et plantaris disseminata
- Prader–Willi syndrome
- Progeria (Hutchinson–Gilford progeria syndrome, Hutchinson–Gilford syndrome, progeria syndrome)
- Progressive osseous heteroplasia
- Progressive symmetric erythrokeratodermia (erythrokeratodermia progressiva symmetrica)
- Proteus syndrome
- Proteus-like syndrome
- Punctate porokeratosis
- Rapp–Hodgkin syndrome (Rapp–Hodgkin ectodermal dysplasia syndrome)
- Recessive dystrophic epidermolysis bullosa (Hallopeau–Siemens variant of epidermolysis bullosa, Hallopeau–Siemens disease)
- Refsum's disease (heredopathia atactica polyneuritiformis, phytanic acid storage disease)
- Relapsing linear acantholytic dermatosis
- Restrictive dermopathy
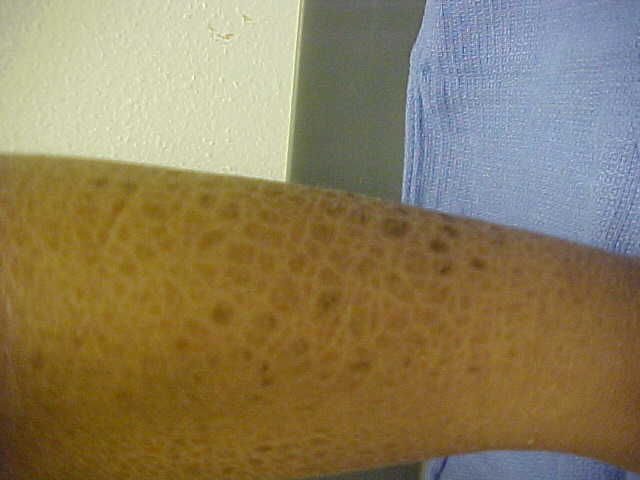
  X-linked ichthyosis
- Rhizomelic chondrodysplasia punctata (autosomal recessive chondrodysplasia punctata type 1, chondrodystrophia calcificans punctata, peroxisomal biogenesis disorder complementation group 11)
- Rombo syndrome
- Rothmund–Thomson syndrome (poikiloderma congenitale)
- Rud syndrome
- Say syndrome
- Scalp–ear–nipple syndrome (Finlay–Marks syndrome)
- Schindler disease (Kanzaki disease, alpha-N-acetylgalactosaminidase deficiency)
- Schinzel–Giedion syndrome
- Scleroatrophic syndrome of Huriez (Huriez syndrome, palmoplantar keratoderma with scleroatrophy, palmoplantar keratoderma with sclerodactyly, scleroatrophic and keratotic dermatosis of the limbs, sclerotylosis)
- Segmental neurofibromatosis
- Senter syndrome (Desmons' syndrome)
- Shabbir syndrome (laryngo–onycho–cutaneous syndrome)
- Silver–Russell syndrome
- Sjögren–Larsson syndrome
- Skin fragility syndrome (plakophilin 1 deficiency)
- Smith–Lemli–Opitz syndrome
- Sturge–Weber syndrome
- Supernumerary nipples–uropathies–Becker's nevus syndrome
- Terminal osseous dysplasia with pigmentary defects
- Tooth and nail syndrome (hypodontia with nail dysgenesis, Witkop syndrome)
- Townes–Brocks syndrome
- Transient bullous dermolysis of the newborn
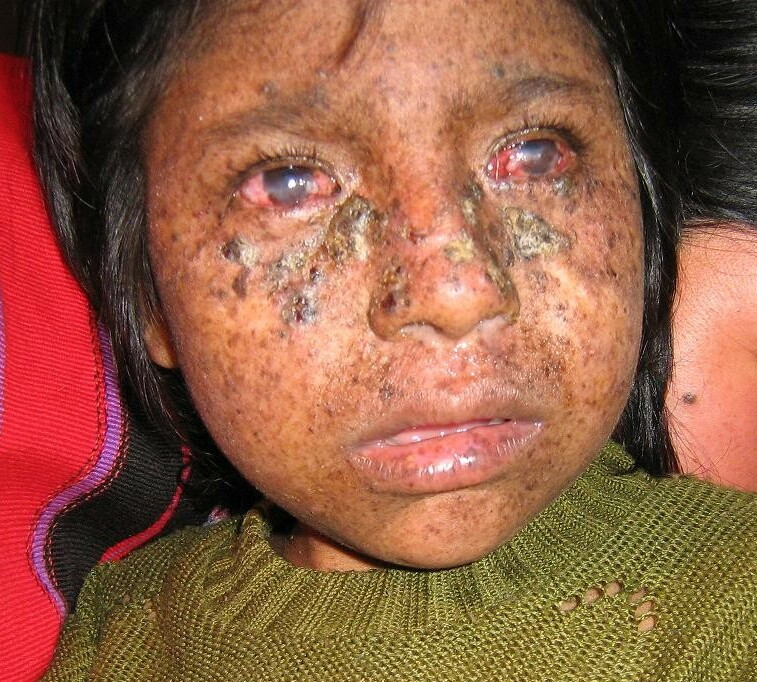
  Xeroderma pigmentosum
- Treacher Collins syndrome (Treacher Collins–Franceschetti syndrome)
- Tricho–dento–osseous syndrome
- Tricho–rhino–phalangeal syndrome
- Tuberous sclerosis (Bourneville disease, epiloia)
- Turner syndrome
- Ulnar–mammary syndrome
- Van Der Woude syndrome
- Von Hippel–Lindau syndrome
- Watson syndrome
- Werner syndrome (adult progeria)
- Westerhof syndrome
- Whistling syndrome (craniocarpotarsal syndrome, distal arthrogryposis type 2, Freeman–Sheldon syndrome, Windmill–Vane–Hand syndrome)
- Wilson–Turner syndrome
- Wolf–Hirschhorn syndrome (4p- syndrome)
- X-linked ichthyosis (steroid sulfatase deficiency, X-linked recessive ichthyosis)
- X-linked recessive chondrodysplasia punctata
- Xeroderma pigmentosum (Cockayne syndrome complex)
- XXYY genotype
- Zimmermann–Laband syndrome

== Infection-related ==
Infection-related cutaneous conditions may be caused by bacteria, fungi, yeast, viruses, or parasites.

=== Bacterium-related ===
Bacterium-related cutaneous conditions often have distinct morphologic characteristics that may be an indication of a generalized systemic process or simply an isolated superficial infection.

- Aeromonas infection
- African tick bite fever
- American tick bite fever (Rickettsia parkeri infection)
- Arcanobacterium haemolyticum infection
- Bacillary angiomatosis
- Bejel (endemic syphilis)
- Blastomycosis-like pyoderma (pyoderma vegetans)
- Blistering distal dactylitis
- Botryomycosis
- Brill–Zinsser disease
- Brucellosis (Bang's disease, Malta fever, undulant fever)
- Bubonic plague
- Bullous impetigo
- Cat scratch disease (cat scratch fever, English–Wear infection, inoculation lymphoreticulosis, subacute regional lymphadenitis)
- Cellulitis
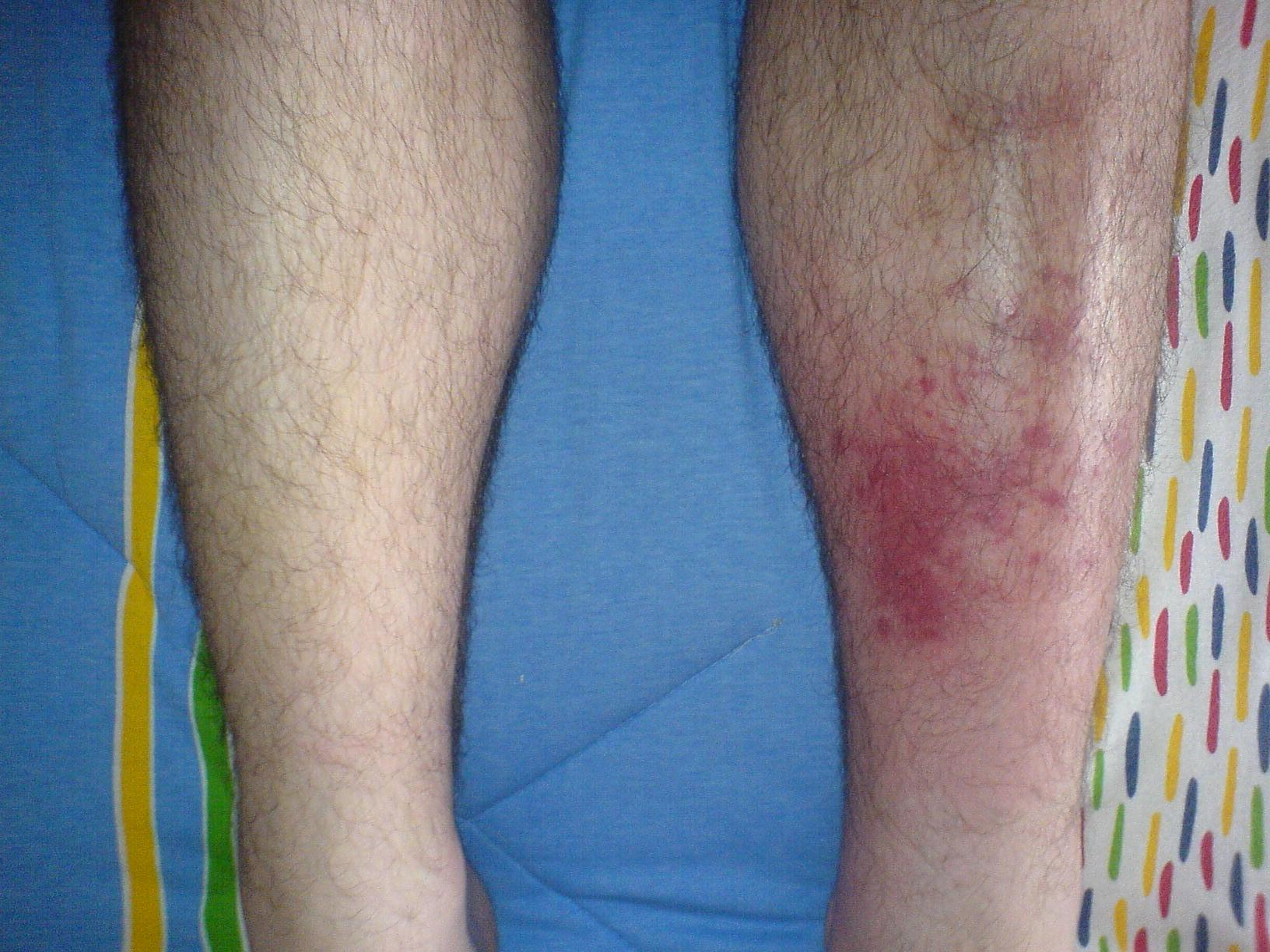
  Cellulitis
- Chancre
- Chancroid (soft chancre, ulcus molle)
- Chlamydial infection
- Chronic lymphangitis
- Chronic recurrent erysipelas
- Chronic undermining burrowing ulcers (Meleney gangrene)
- Chromobacteriosis infection
- Condylomata lata
- Cutaneous actinomycosis
- Cutaneous anthrax infection
- Cutaneous C. diphtheriae infection (Barcoo rot, diphtheric desert sore, septic sore, Veldt sore)
- Cutaneous group B streptococcal infection
- Cutaneous Pasteurella hemolytica infection
- Cutaneous Streptococcus iniae infection
- Dermatitis gangrenosa (gangrene of the skin)
- Ecthyma
- Ecthyma gangrenosum
- Ehrlichiosis ewingii infection
- Elephantiasis nostras
- Endemic typhus (murine typhus)
- Epidemic typhus (epidemic louse-borne typhus)
- Erysipelas (ignis sacer, Saint Anthony's fire)
- Erysipeloid of Rosenbach
- Erythema marginatum
- Erythrasma
- External otitis (otitis externa, swimmer's ear)
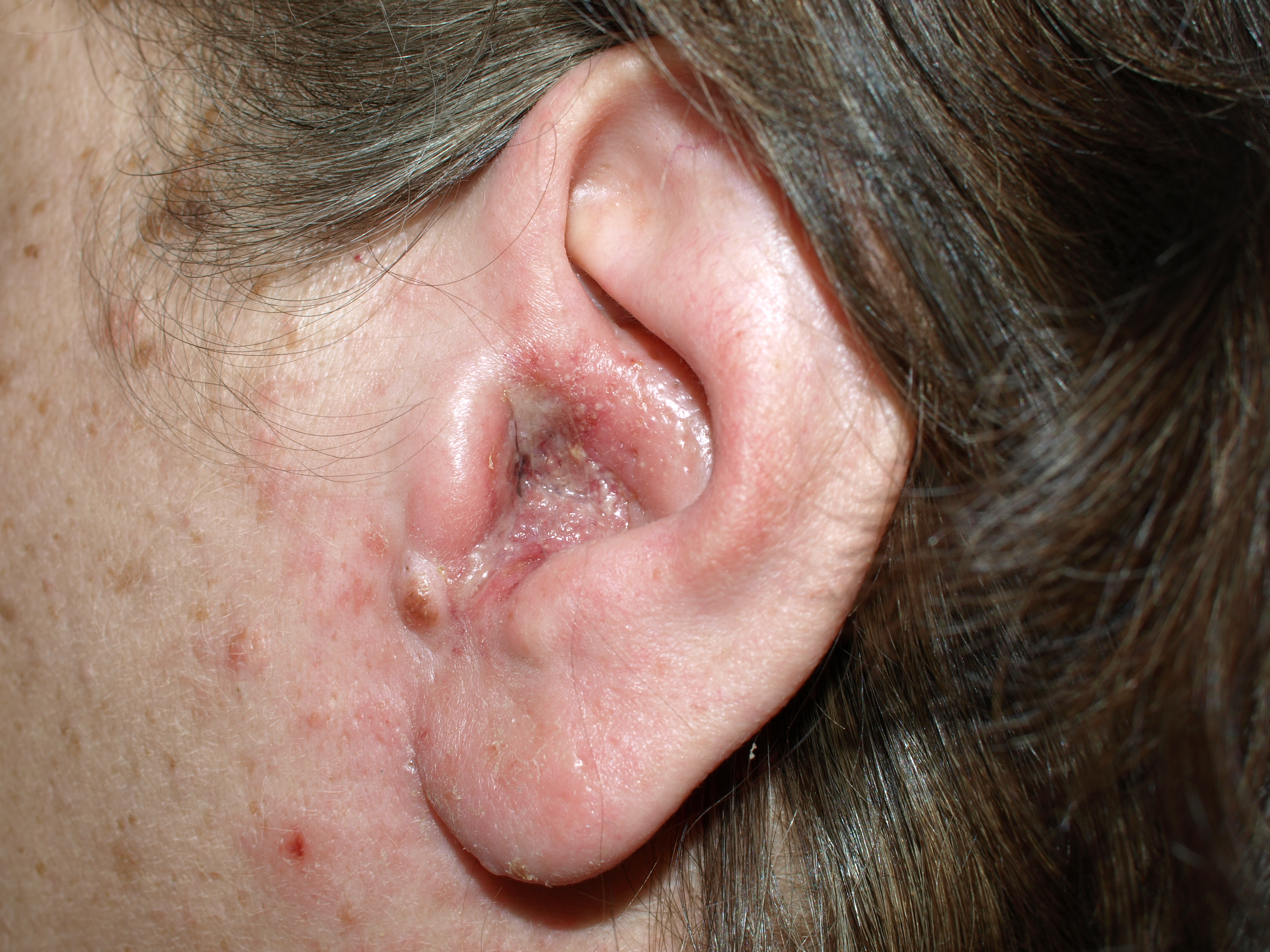
  External otitis
- Felon
- Flea-borne spotted fever
- Flinders Island spotted fever
- Flying squirrel typhus
- Folliculitis
- Fournier gangrene (Fournier gangrene of the penis or scrotum)
- Furunculosis (boil)
- Gas gangrene (clostridial myonecrosis, myonecrosis)
- Glanders (equinia, farcy, malleus)
- Gonococcemia (arthritis–dermatosis syndrome, disseminated gonococcal infection)
- Gonorrhea (clap)
- Gram-negative folliculitis
- Gram-negative toe web infection
- Granuloma inguinale (Donovanosis, granuloma genitoinguinale, granuloma inguinale tropicum, granuloma venereum, granuloma venereum genitoinguinale, lupoid form of groin ulceration, serpiginous ulceration of the groin, ulcerating granuloma of the pudendum, ulcerating sclerosing granuloma)
- Green nail syndrome
- Group JK Corynebacterium sepsis
- Haemophilus influenzae cellulitis
- Helicobacter cellulitis
- Hospital furunculosis
- Hot tub folliculitis (Pseudomonas aeruginosa folliculitis)
- Human granulocytotropic anaplasmosis
- Human monocytotropic ehrlichiosis
- Impetigo contagiosa
- Japanese spotted fever
- Leptospirosis (Fort Bragg fever, pretibial fever, Weil's disease)
- Listeriosis
- Ludwig's angina
- Lupoid sycosis
- Lyme disease (Afzelius' disease, Lyme borreliosis)
- Lymphogranuloma venereum (climatic bubo, Durand–Nicolas–Favre disease, lymphogranuloma inguinale, poradenitis inguinale, strumous bubo)
- Malakoplakia (malacoplakia)
- Mediterranean spotted fever (Boutonneuse fever)
- Melioidosis (Whitmore's disease)
- Meningococcemia
- Missouri Lyme disease
- Mycoplasma infection
- Necrotizing fasciitis (flesh-eating bacteria syndrome)
- Neonatal toxic shock-like exanthematous disease
- Nocardiosis
- Noma neonatorum
- North Asian tick typhus
- Ophthalmia neonatorum
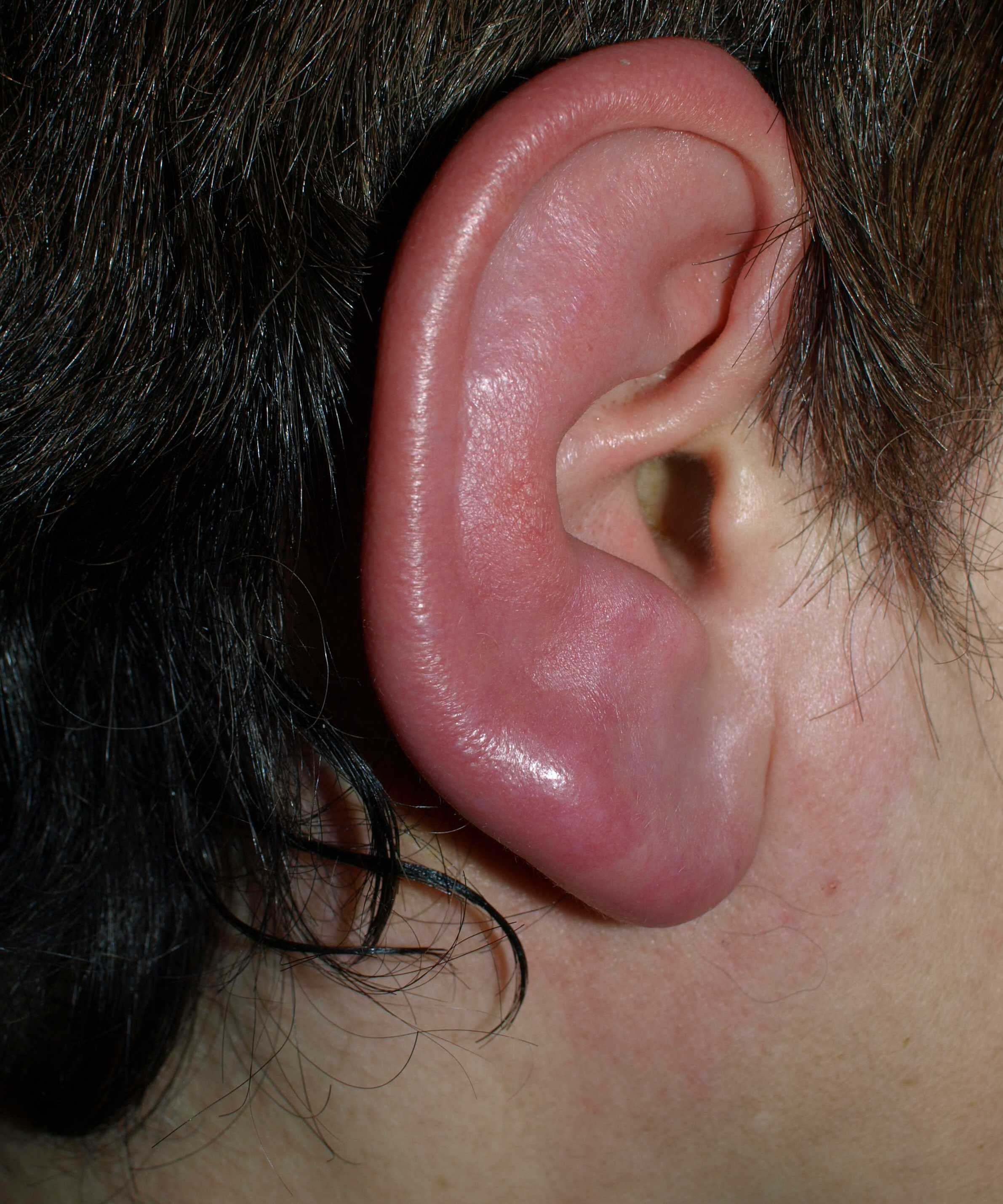
  Erysipelas
- Oroya fever (Carrion's disease)
- Pasteurellosis
- Perianal cellulitis (perineal dermatitis, streptococcal perianal disease)
- Periapical abscess
- Pinta
- Pitted keratolysis (keratolysis plantare sulcatum, keratoma plantare sulcatum, ringed keratolysis)
- Plague
- Primary gonococcal dermatitis
- Pseudomonal pyoderma
- Pseudomonas hot-foot syndrome
- Pyogenic paronychia
- Pyomyositis
- Q fever
- Queensland tick typhus
- Rat-bite fever
- Recurrent toxin-mediated perineal erythema
- Rhinoscleroma
- Rickettsia aeschlimannii infection
- Rickettsialpox
- Rocky Mountain spotted fever
- Saber shin (anterior tibial bowing)
- Saddle nose
- Salmonellosis
- Scarlet fever
- Scrub typhus (Tsutsugamushi fever)
- Shigellosis
- Staphylococcal scalded skin syndrome (pemphigus neonatorum, Ritter's disease)
- Streptococcal intertrigo
- Superficial pustular folliculitis (impetigo of Bockhart, superficial folliculitis)
- Sycosis vulgaris (barber's itch, sycosis barbae)
- Syphilid
- Syphilis (lues)
- Tick-borne lymphadenopathy
- Toxic shock syndrome (streptococcal toxic shock syndrome, streptococcal toxic shock-like syndrome, toxic streptococcal syndrome)
- Trench fever (five-day fever, quintan fever, urban trench fever)
- Tropical ulcer (Aden ulcer, jungle rot, Malabar ulcer, tropical phagedena)
- Tularemia (deer fly fever, Ohara's disease, Pahvant Valley plague, rabbit fever)
- Verruga peruana
- Vibrio vulnificus infection
- Yaws (bouba, frambösie, parangi, pian)

==== Mycobacterium-related ====
Mycobacterium-related cutaneous conditions are caused by Mycobacterium infections.

- Aquarium granuloma (fish-tank granuloma, swimming-pool granuloma)
- Borderline lepromatous leprosy
- Borderline leprosy
- Borderline tuberculoid leprosy
- Buruli ulcer (Bairnsdale ulcer, Searl ulcer, Searle's ulcer)
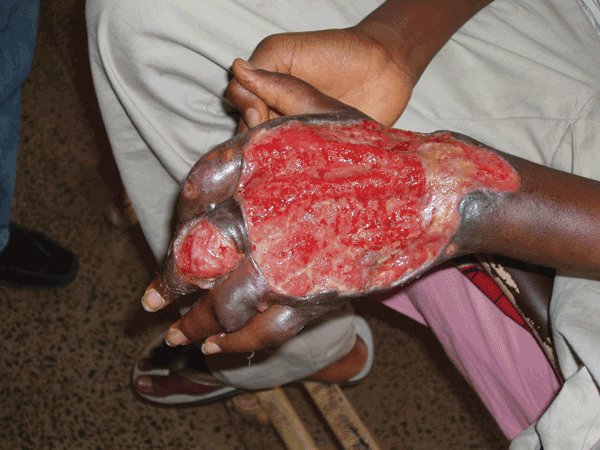
  Buruli ulcer
- Erythema induratum (Bazin disease)
- Histoid leprosy
- Lepromatous leprosy
- Leprosy (Hansen's disease)
- Lichen scrofulosorum (tuberculosis cutis lichenoides)
- Lupus vulgaris (tuberculosis luposa)
- Miliary tuberculosis (disseminated tuberculosis, tuberculosis cutis acuta generalisata, tuberculosis cutis disseminata)
- Mycobacterium avium-intracellulare complex infection
- Mycobacterium haemophilum infection
- Mycobacterium kansasii infection
- Papulonecrotic tuberculid
- Primary inoculation tuberculosis (cutaneous primary complex, primary tuberculous complex, tuberculous chancre)
- Rapid-growing Mycobacterium infection
- Scrofuloderma (tuberculosis cutis colliquativa)
- Tuberculosis cutis orificialis (acute tuberculous ulcer, orificial tuberculosis)
- Tuberculosis verrucosa cutis (lupus verrucosus, prosector's wart, warty tuberculosis)
- Tuberculous cellulitis
- Tuberculous gumma (metastatic tuberculous abscess, metastatic tuberculous ulcer)
- Tuberculoid leprosy

=== Mycosis-related ===
Mycosis-related cutaneous conditions are caused by fungi or yeasts, and may present as either a superficial or deep infection of the skin, hair, or nails.

- African histoplasmosis
- Alternariosis
- Antibiotic candidiasis (iatrogenic candidiasis)
- Black piedra
- Candidal intertrigo
- Candidal onychomycosis
- Candidal paronychia
- Candidal vulvovaginitis
- Candidid
- Chromoblastomycosis (chromomycosis, cladosporiosis, Fonseca's disease, Pedroso's disease, phaeosporotrichosis, verrucous dermatitis)
- Chronic mucocutaneous candidiasis
- Coccidioidomycosis (California disease, desert rheumatism, San Joaquin Valley fever, valley fever)
- Congenital cutaneous candidiasis
- Cryptococcosis
- Dermatophytid
- Diaper candidiasis
- Disseminated coccidioidomycosis (coccidioidal granuloma)
- Distal subungual onychomycosis
- Entomophthoromycosis
- Erosio interdigitalis blastomycetica
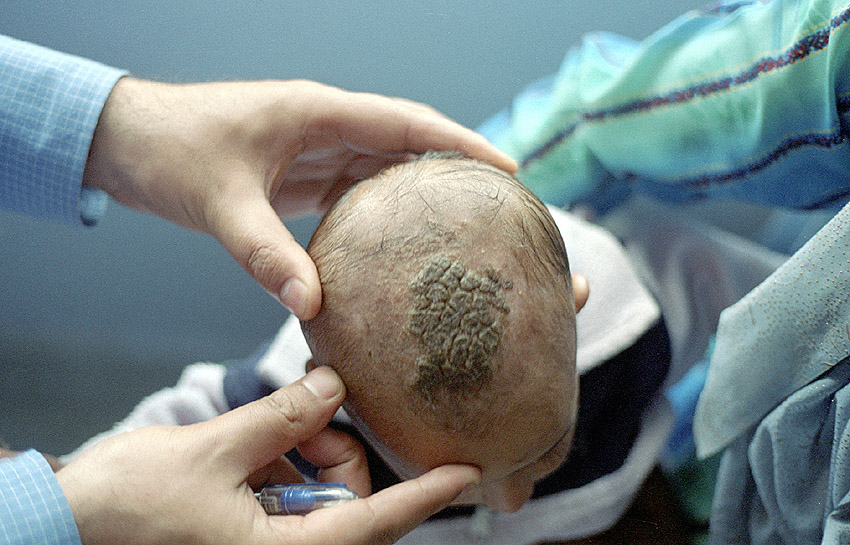
  Favus
- Favus
- Fungal folliculitis (majocchi granuloma)
- Fusariosis
- Geotrichosis
- Granuloma gluteale infantum
- Histoplasmosis (cave disease, Darling's disease, Ohio Valley disease, reticuloendotheliosis)
- Hyalohyphomycosis
- Kerion
- Lobomycosis (keloidal blastomycosis, lacaziosis, Lobo's disease)
- Mucormycosis
- Mycetoma (Madura foot, maduromycosis)
- North American blastomycosis (blastomycetic dermatitis, blastomycosis, Gilchrist's disease)
- Onychomycosis (dermatophytic onychomycosis, ringworm of the nail, tinea unguium)
- Oral candidiasis (thrush)
- Otomycosis
- Perianal candidiasis
- Perlèche (angular cheilitis)
- Phaeohyphomycosis
- Piedra (trichosporosis)
- Pityrosporum folliculitis
- Primary cutaneous aspergillosis
- Primary cutaneous coccidioidomycosis
- Primary cutaneous histoplasmosis
- Primary pulmonary coccidioidomycosis
- Primary pulmonary histoplasmosis
- Progressive disseminated histoplasmosis
- Proximal subungual onychomycosis
- Rhinosporidiosis
- South American blastomycosis (Brazilian blastomycosis, paracoccidioidal granuloma, paracoccidioidomycosis)
- Sporotrichosis (rose-gardener's disease)
- Systemic candidiasis
- Tinea barbae (barber's itch, ringworm of the beard, tinea sycosis)
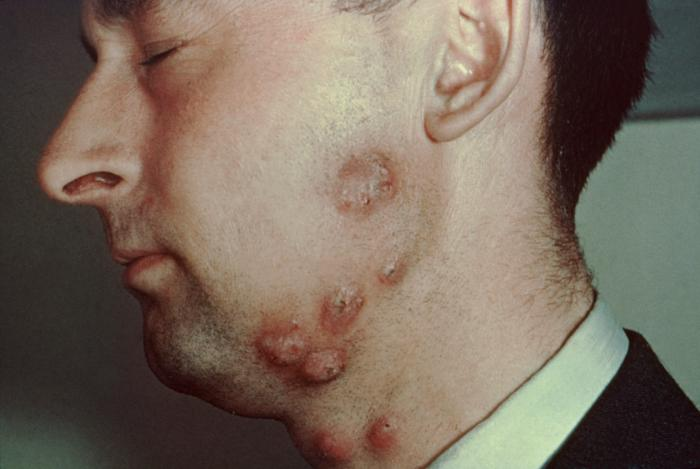
  Tinea barbae
- Tinea capitis (herpes tonsurans, ringworm of the hair, ringworm of the scalp, scalp ringworm, tinea tonsurans)
- Tinea corporis (ringworm, tinea circinata, tinea glabrosa)
- Tinea corporis gladiatorum
- Tinea cruris (crotch itch, eczema marginatum, gym itch, jock itch, ringworm of the groin)
- Tinea faciei
- Tinea imbricata (tokelau)
- Tinea incognito
- Tinea manuum
- Tinea nigra (superficial phaeohyphomycosis, tinea nigra palmaris et plantaris)
- Tinea pedis (athlete's foot, ringworm of the foot)
- Tinea versicolor (dermatomycosis furfuracea, pityriasis versicolor, tinea flava)
- Trichophyton mentagrophytes VII (TMVII) (an emerging sexually transmitted tinea of the genitals, buttocks, face, trunk, and extremities)
- White piedra
- White superficial onychomycosis
- Zygomycosis (phycomycosis)

=== Parasitic infestations, stings, and bites ===
Parasitic infestations, stings, and bites in humans are caused by several groups of organisms belonging to the following phyla: Annelida, Arthropoda, Bryozoa, Chordata, Cnidaria, Cyanobacteria, Echinodermata, Nemathelminthes, Platyhelminthes, and Protozoa.

- Acanthamoeba infection
- Amebiasis cutis
- Ant sting
- Arachnidism
- Baker's itch
- Balamuthia infection
- Bedbug infestation (bedbug bite, cimicosis)
- Bee and wasp stings
- Blister beetle dermatitis
- Bombardier beetle burn
- Bristleworm sting
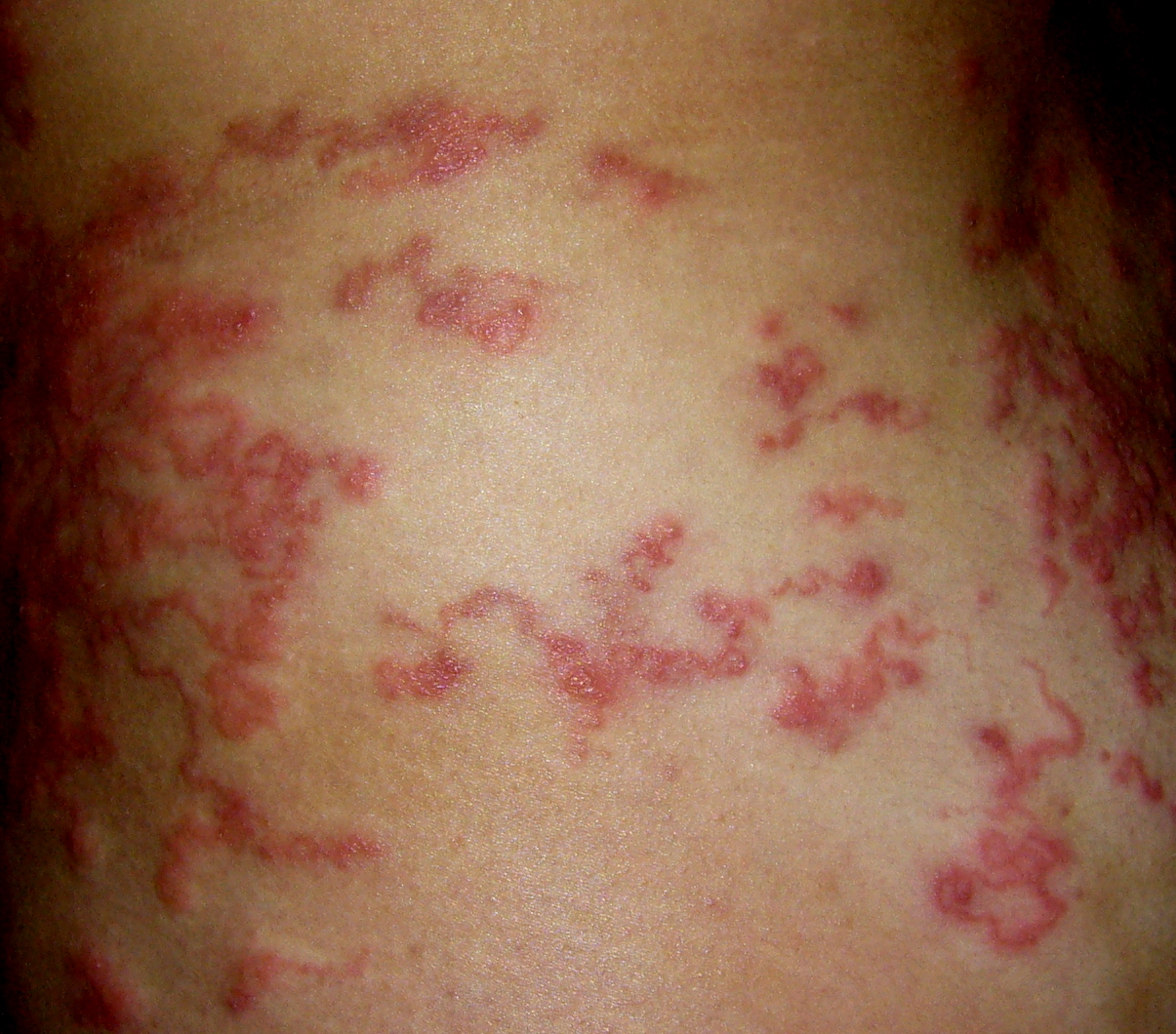
  Creeping eruption
- Centipede bite
- Cheyletiella dermatitis
- Chigger bite
- Coolie itch
- Copra itch
- Coral dermatitis
- Creeping eruption (cutaneous larva migrans)
- Cutaneous leishmaniasis (Aleppo boil, Baghdad boil, bay sore, Biskra button, Chiclero ulcer, Delhi boil, Kandahar sore, Lahore sore, leishmaniasis tropica, oriental sore, pian bois, uta)
- Cysticercosis cutis
- Demodex folliculitis, usually caused by the Demodex folliculorum mite
- Dogger Bank itch
- Dracunculiasis (dracontiasis, guinea worm disease, Medina worm)
- Echinococcosis (hydatid disease)
- Elephantiasis tropica (elephantiasis arabum)
- Elephant skin
- Enterobiasis (oxyuriasis, pinworm infection, seatworm infection)
- Erisipela de la costa
- Feather pillow dermatitis
- Funnel web spider bite
- Gamasoidosis
- Gnathostomiasis (larva migrans profundus)
- Grain itch (barley itch, mattress itch, prairie itch, straw itch)
- Grocer's itch
- Head lice infestation (cooties, pediculosis capitis)
- Hookworm disease (ancylostomiasis, ground itch, necatoriasis, uncinariasis)
- Human trypanosomiasis
- Hydroid dermatitis
- Irukandji syndrome
- Jellyfish dermatitis
- Ked itch
- Larva currens
- Latrodectism (widow spider bite)
- Leech bite
- Leopard skin
- Lepidopterism (Caripito itch, caterpillar dermatitis, moth dermatitis)
- Lizard skin
- Loaiasis (Calabar swelling, fugitive swelling, loa loa, tropical swelling)
- Loxoscelism (brown recluse spider bite, necrotic cutaneous loxoscelism)
- Mal morando
- Millipede burn
- Mosquito bite
- Mucocutaneous leishmaniasis (espundia, leishmaniasis Americana)
- Myiasis
- Nairobi fly dermatitis (Kenya fly dermatitis, Nairobi eye)
- Nematode dermatitis
- Norwegian scabies (crusted scabies)
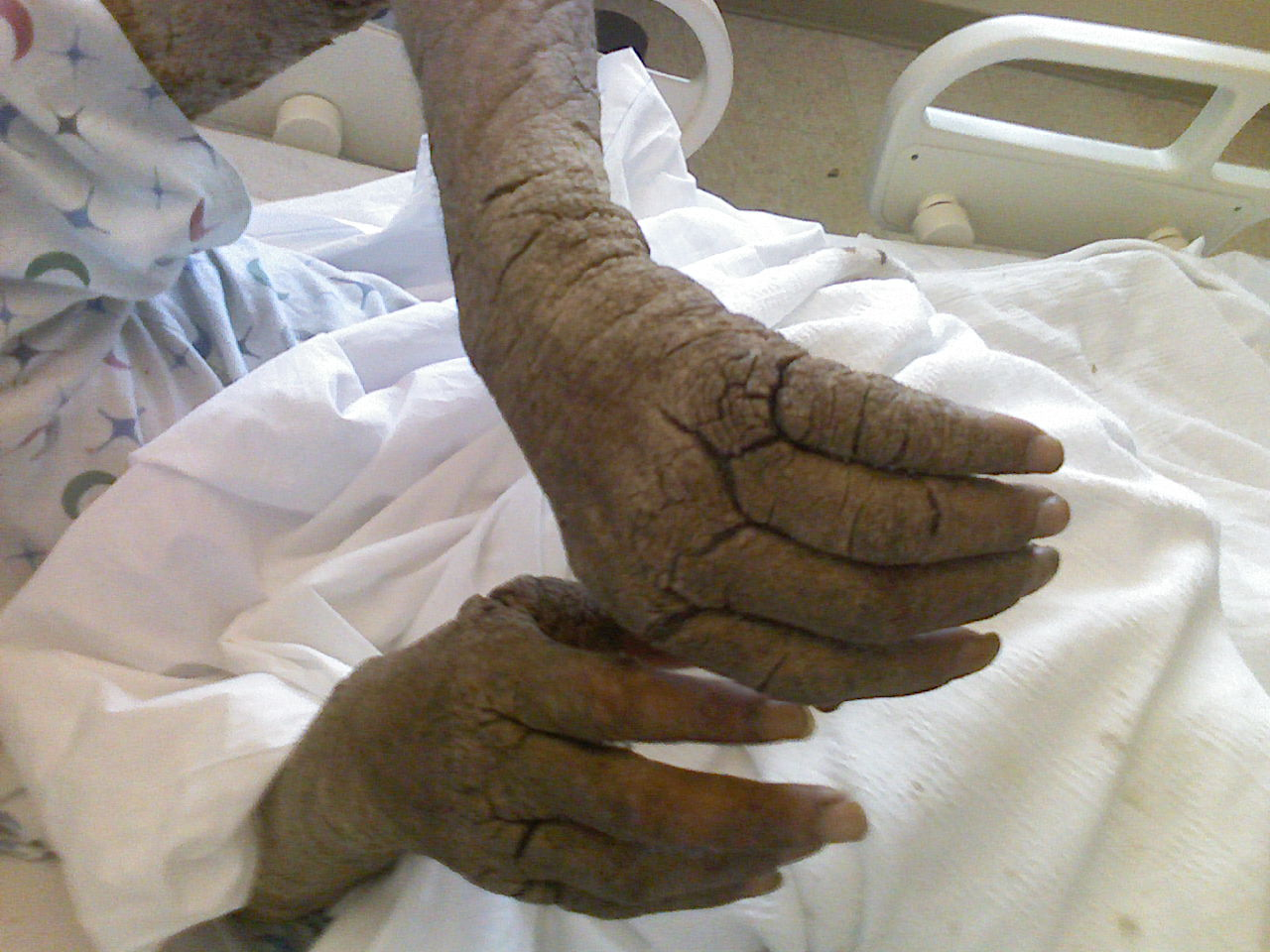
  Norwegian scabies
- Onchocerciasis
- Ophthalmia nodosa
- Paederus dermatitis
- Pediculosis corporis (pediculosis vestimenti, Vagabond's disease)
- Pediculosis pubis (crabs, phthirus pubis, phthirus pubis, pubic lice)
- Pneumocystosis (often classified as fungal)
- Portuguese man-of-war dermatitis
- Post-kala-azar dermal leishmaniasis (post-kala-azar dermatosis)
- Protothecosis
- Pulicosis (flea bites)
- Reduviid bite
- Scabies (itch mite infestation, seven-year itch)
- Scorpion sting
- Sea anemone dermatitis
- Seabather's eruption (sea lice)
- Sea urchin injury
- Seaweed dermatitis
- Snake bite
- Sowda
- Sparganosis
- Spider bite
- Stingray injury
- Swimmer's itch (cercarial dermatitis, schistosome cercarial dermatitis)
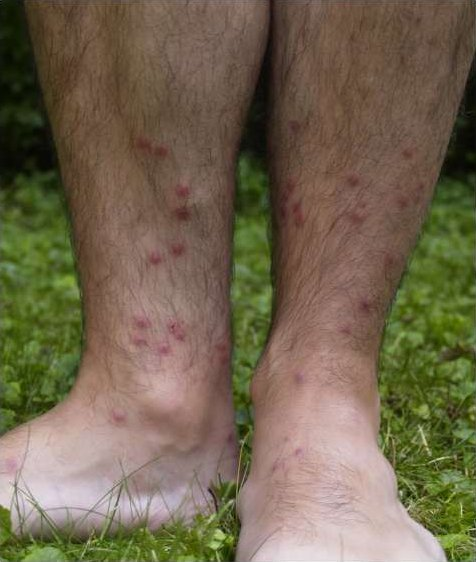
  Swimmer's itch
- Tarantula bite
- Tick bite
- Toxoplasmosis
- Trichinosis
- Trichomoniasis
- Tungiasis (bicho de pie, chigoe flea bite, jigger bite, nigua, pique)
- Visceral leishmaniasis (dumdum fever, kala-azar)
- Visceral schistosomiasis (bilharziasis)
- Viscerotropic leishmaniasis
- Wheat warehouse itch

=== Virus-related ===
Virus-related cutaneous conditions are caused by two main groups of viruses–DNA and RNA types–both of which are obligatory intracellular parasites.

- Alphavirus infection
- Asymmetric periflexural exanthem of childhood (unilateral laterothoracic exanthem)
- B virus infection
- Boston exanthem disease
- Bovine papular stomatitis
- Bowenoid papulosis
- Buffalopox
- Butcher's wart
- Chikungunya fever
- Condylomata acuminata
- Congenital rubella syndrome
- Cowpox
- Cytomegalic inclusion disease
- Dengue (Break-bone fever)
- Disseminated herpes zoster
- Eczema herpeticum (Kaposi's varicelliform eruption)
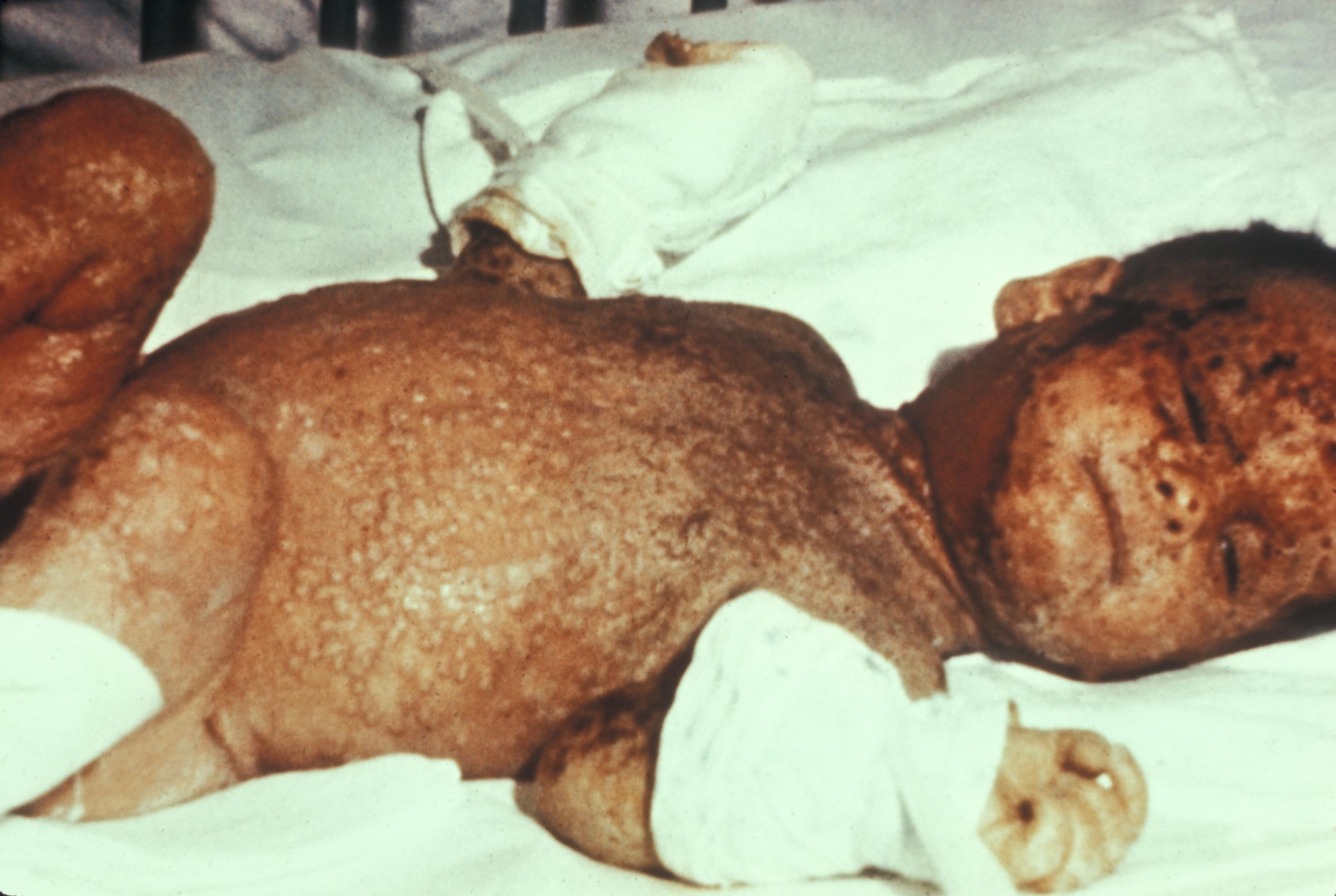
  Eczema vaccinatum
- Eczema vaccinatum
- Epidermodysplasia verruciformis
- Eruptive pseudoangiomatosis
- Erythema infectiosum (fifth disease, slapped cheek disease)
- Exanthem of primary HIV infection (acute retroviral syndrome)
- Farmyard pox
- Generalized vaccinia
- Genital herpes (herpes genitalis, herpes progenitalis)
- Gianotti–Crosti syndrome (infantile papular acrodermatitis, papular acrodermatitis of childhood, papulovesicular acrolocated syndrome)
- Giant condyloma acuminatum (Buschke–Löwenstein tumor, giant condyloma of Buschke–Löwenstein tumor)
- Hand-foot-and-mouth disease
- Heck's disease (focal epithelial hyperplasia)
- Hemorrhagic fever with renal syndrome
- Hepatitis B
- Hepatitis C
- Herpangina
- Herpes gladiatorum (scrum pox)
- Herpes simplex
- Herpes zoster oticus (Ramsay–Hunt syndrome)
- Herpetic keratoconjunctivitis
- Herpetic sycosis
- Herpetic whitlow
- HIV-associated pruritus
- Human monkeypox
- Human T-lymphotropic virus 1 infection
- Human tanapox
- Immune reconstitution inflammatory syndrome (immune recovery syndrome)
- Infectious mononucleosis (glandular fever)
- Inflammatory skin lesions following zoster infection (isotopic response)
- Intrauterine herpes simplex
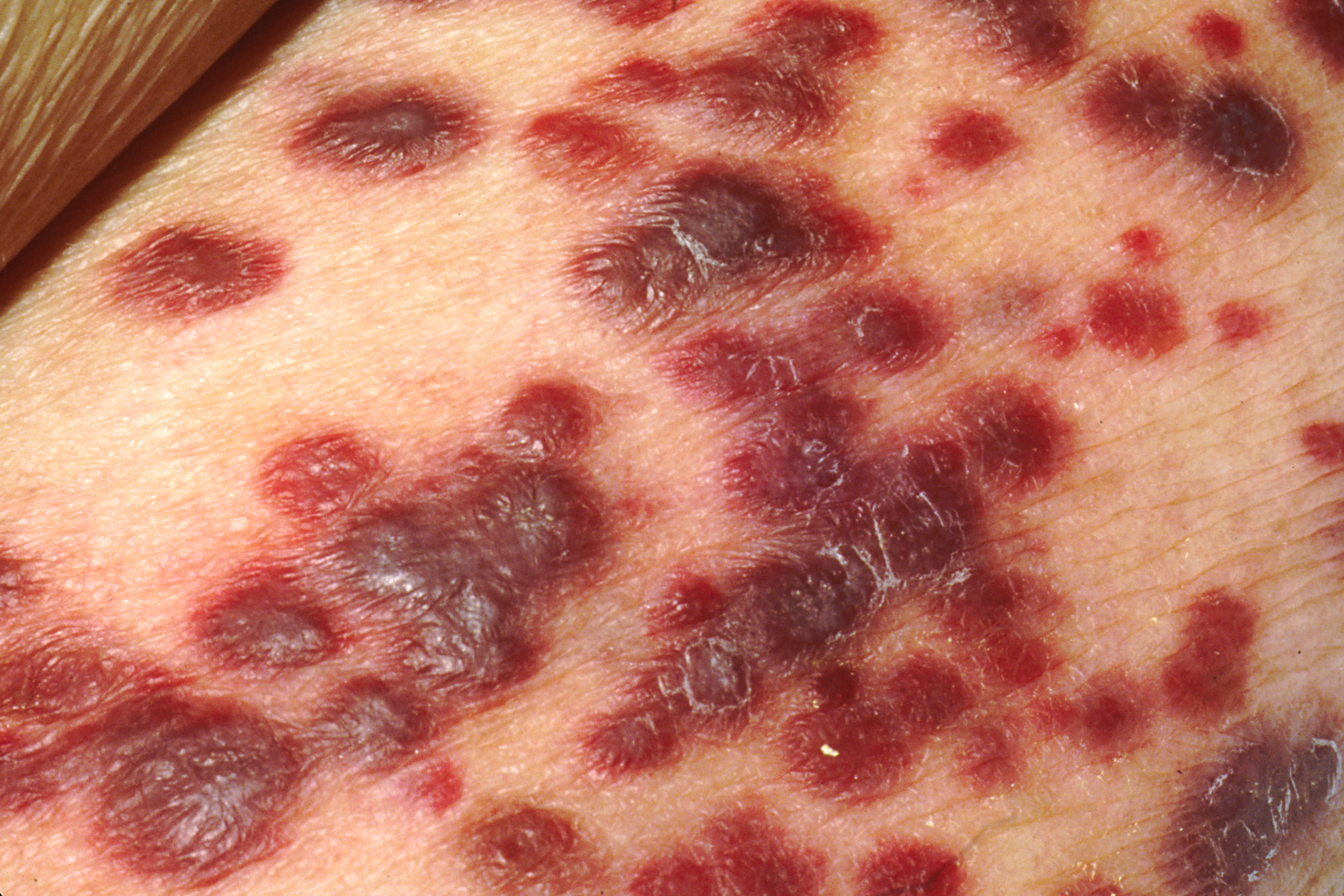
  Kaposi sarcoma
- Kaposi sarcoma
- Lassa fever
- Lipschütz ulcer (ulcus vulvae acutum)
- Measles (rubeola, morbilli)
- Milker's nodule
- Modified varicella-like syndrome
- Molluscum contagiosum
- Myrmecia
- Neonatal herpes simplex
- Ophthalmic zoster
- Orf (contagious pustular dermatosis, ecthyma contagiosum, infectious labial dermatitis, sheep pox)
- Orf-induced immunobullous disease
- Orolabial herpes (herpes labialis)
- Papular purpuric gloves and socks syndrome
- Pigmented wart
- Postherpetic neuralgia (zoster-associated pain)
- Post-vaccination follicular eruption
- Progressive vaccinia (vaccinia gangrenosum, vaccinia necrosum)
- Pseudocowpox
- Recurrent respiratory papillomatosis (laryngeal papillomatosis)
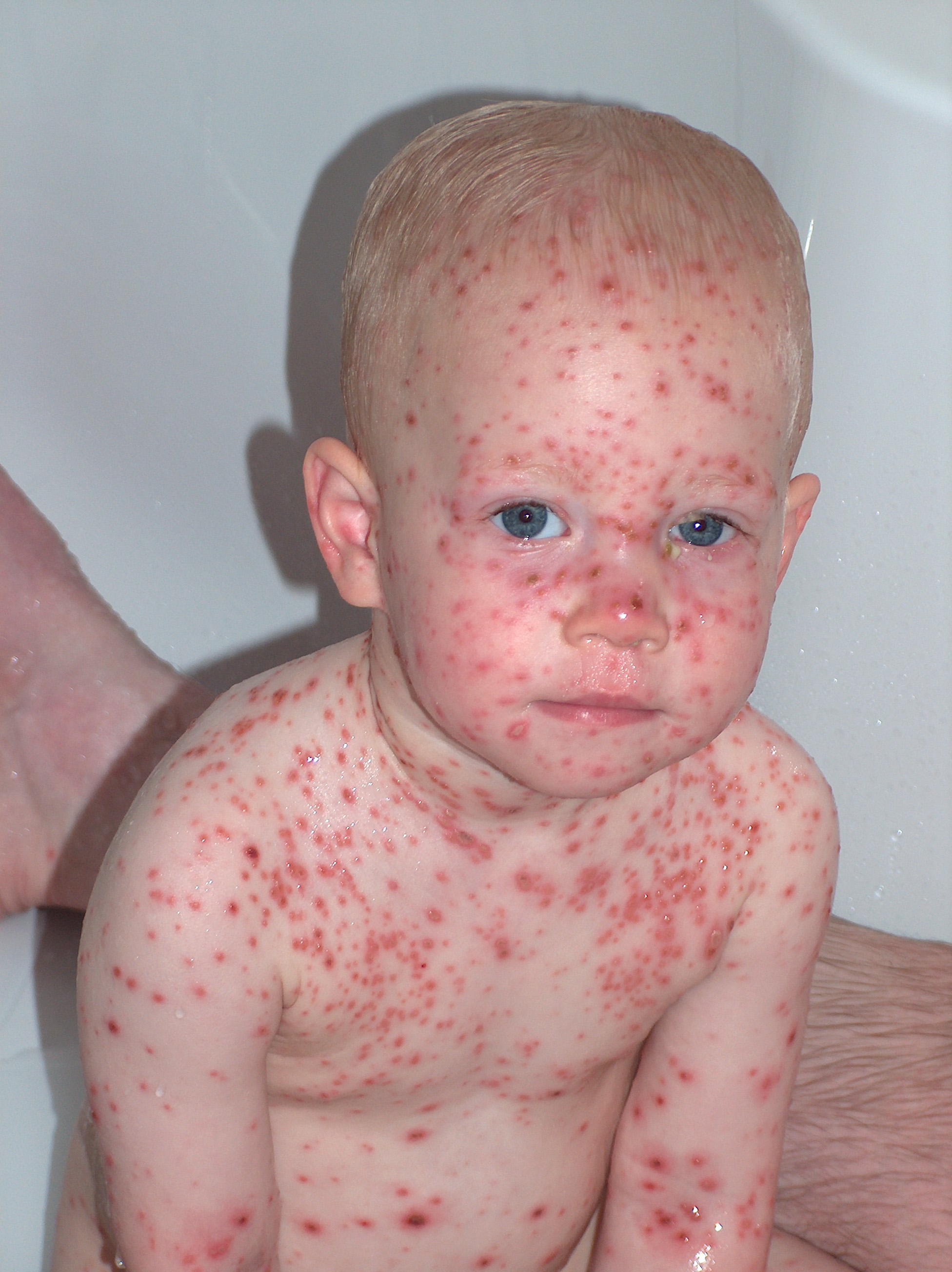
  Varicella
- Rift Valley fever
- Roseola infantum (exanthem subitum, exanthema subitum, sixth disease)
- Roseola vaccinia
- Rubella (German measles)
- Sandfly fever (Pappataci fever, phlebotomus fever)
- Sealpox
- Varicella (chickenpox)
- Variola major (smallpox)
- Verruca plana (flat wart)
- Verruca plantaris (plantar wart)
- Verruca vulgaris (wart)
- Verrucae palmares et plantares
- Viral-associated trichodysplasia (ciclosporin-induced folliculodystrophy)
- Wasting syndrome
- West Nile virus infection
- Zoster (herpes zoster, shingles)
- Zoster sine herpete

== Lichenoid eruptions ==
Lichenoid eruptions are dermatoses related to the unique, common inflammatory disorder lichen planus, which affects the skin, mucous membranes, nails, and hair.

- Annular lichen planus
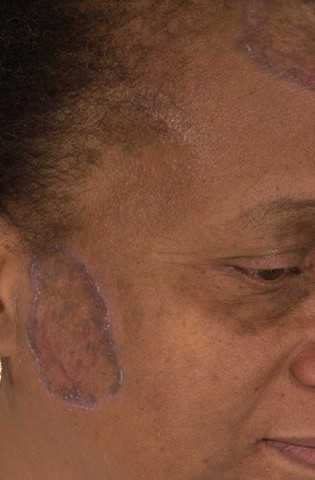
  Lichen planus actinicus
- Atrophic lichen planus
- Bullous lichen planus (vesiculobullous lichen planus)
- Erosive lichen planus
- Erythema dyschromicum perstans (ashy dermatosis, dermatosis cinecienta)
- Giant cell lichenoid dermatitis
- Hepatitis-associated lichen planus
- Hypertrophic lichen planus (lichen planus verrucosus)
- Idiopathic eruptive macular pigmentation
- Inverse lichen planus
- Keratosis lichenoides chronica (Nékam's disease)
- Kraurosis vulvae
- Lichen nitidus
- Lichen planus actinicus (actinic lichen nitidus, actinic lichen planus, lichen planus atrophicus annularis, lichen planus subtropicus, lichen planus tropicus, lichenoid melanodermatitis, lichenoid melanodermatosis, summertime actinic lichenoid eruption)
- Lichen planus pemphigoides
- Lichen planus pigmentosus
- Lichen planus–lichen sclerosus overlap syndrome
- Lichen ruber moniliformis
- Lichen sclerosus (lichen sclerosus et atrophicus)
- Lichen striatus (Blaschko linear acquired inflammatory skin eruption, linear lichenoid dermatosis)
- Lichen verrucosus et reticularis
- Lichenoid trikeratosis
- Lichenoid dermatitis
- Lichenoid reaction of graft-versus-host disease
- Linear lichen planus
- Mucosal lichen planus
- Peno-gingival syndrome
- Ulcerative lichen planus
- Vulvovaginal gingival syndrome
- Vulvovaginal lichen planus

== Lymphoid-related ==
Lymphoid-related cutaneous conditions are a group of disorders characterized by collections of lymphocyte cells within the skin.

- Adult T-cell leukemia/lymphoma
- Angiocentric lymphoma (extranodal natural killer cell lymphoma, nasal-type NK lymphoma, NK/T-cell lymphoma, polymorphic/malignant midline reticulosis)
- Angioimmunoblastic T-cell lymphoma (angioimmunoblastic lymphadenopathy with dysproteinemia)
- Blastic NK-cell lymphoma
- CD30+ cutaneous T-cell lymphoma (primary cutaneous anaplastic large cell lymphoma)
- Cutaneous lymphoid hyperplasia (borrelial lymphocytoma, lymphadenosis benigna cutis, lymphocytoma cutis, pseudolymphoma, pseudolymphoma of Spiegler and Fendt, sarcoidosis of Spiegler and Fendt, Spiegler–Fendt lymphoid hyperplasia, Spiegler–Fendt sarcoid)
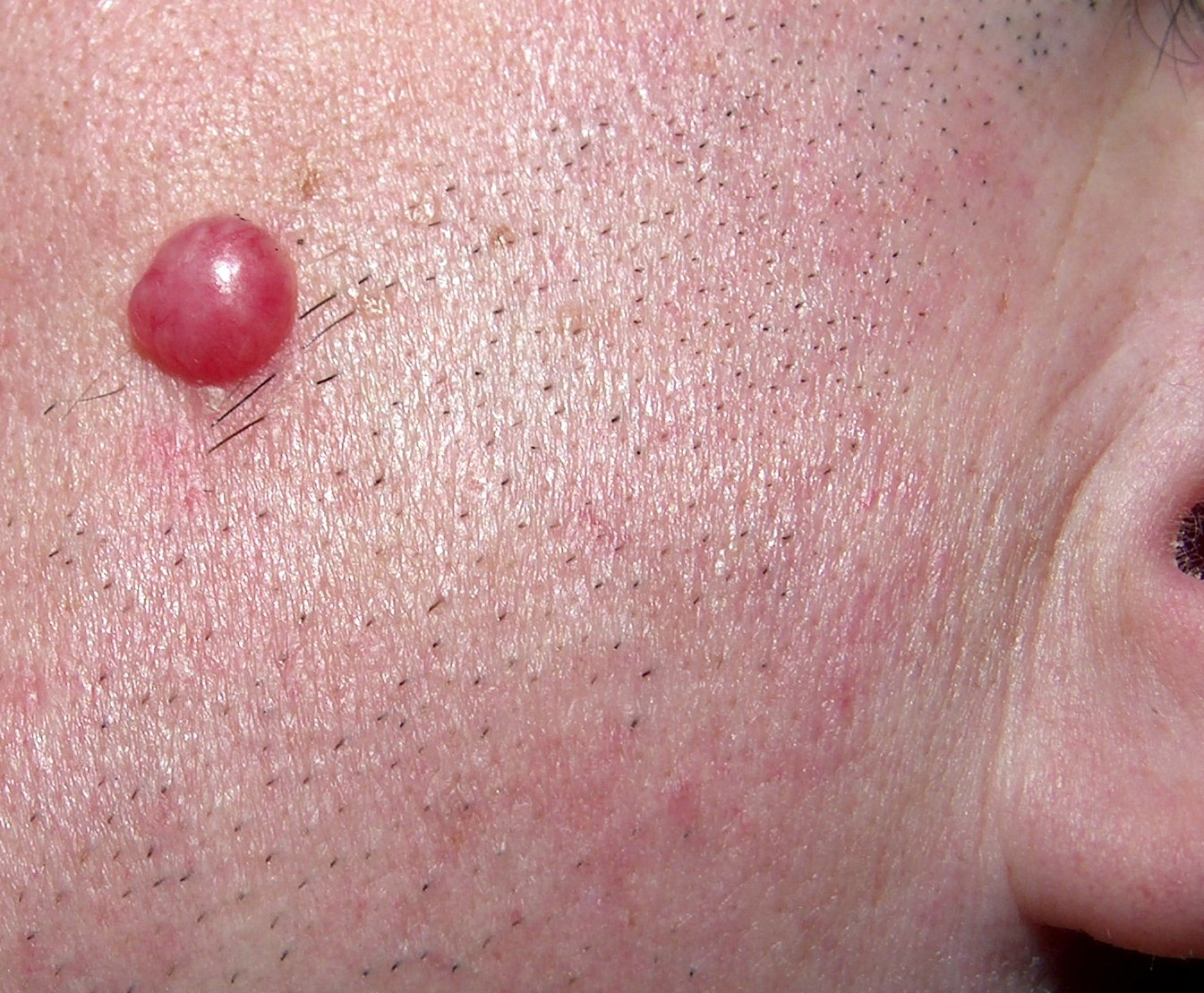
  Cutaneous lymphoid hyperplasia
- Cutaneous lymphoid hyperplasia with bandlike and perivascular patterns
- Cutaneous lymphoid hyperplasia with nodular pattern (nodular pattern of cutaneous lymphoid hyperplasia)
- Diffuse large B-cell lymphoma (primary cutaneous large B-cell lymphoma)
- Granulocytic sarcoma (chloroma, myeloid sarcoma)
- Granulomatous slack skin
- Hairy-cell leukemia
- Hodgkin's disease
- Ichthyosis acquisita (acquired ichthyosis)
- IgG_{4}-related skin disease
- Intravascular large B-cell lymphoma (angiotropic large cell lymphoma, intralymphatic lymphomatosis, intravascular lymphomatosis, malignant angioendotheliomatosis)
- Jessner lymphocytic infiltrate of the skin (benign lymphocytic infiltration of the skin, Jessner lymphocytic infiltration of the skin, Jessner–Kanof lymphocytic infiltration of the skin, lymphocytic infiltrate of Jessner)
- Kikuchi's disease (histiocytic necrotizing lymphadenitis)
- Large plaque parapsoriasis (parapsoriasis en plaques)
- Lennert lymphoma (lymphoepitheliod lymphoma)
- Leukemia cutis
- Lymphoma cutis
- Lymphomatoid granulomatosis
- Lymphomatoid papulosis
- Malignant histiocytosis (histiocytic medullary reticulosis)
- Marginal zone B-cell lymphoma
- Mucosa-associated lymphoid tissue lymphoma
- Mycosis fungoides
- Non-mycosis fungoides CD30− cutaneous large T-cell lymphoma
- Nonspecific cutaneous conditions associated with leukemia (leukemid)
- Pagetoid reticulosis (acral mycoses fungoides, localized epidermotropic reticulosis, mycosis fungoides palmaris et plantaris, unilesional mycosis fungoides, Woringer–Kolopp disease)
- Pityriasis lichenoides chronica (chronic guttate parapsoriasis, chronic pityriasis lichenoides, dermatitis psoriasiformis nodularis, parapsoriasis chronica, parapsoriasis lichenoides chronica)
- Pityriasis lichenoides et varioliformis acuta (acute guttate parapsoriasis, acute parapsoriasis, acute pityriasis lichenoides, Mucha–Habermann disease, parapsoriasis acuta, parapsoriasis lichenoides et varioliformis acuta, parapsoriasis varioliformis)
- Plasmacytoma
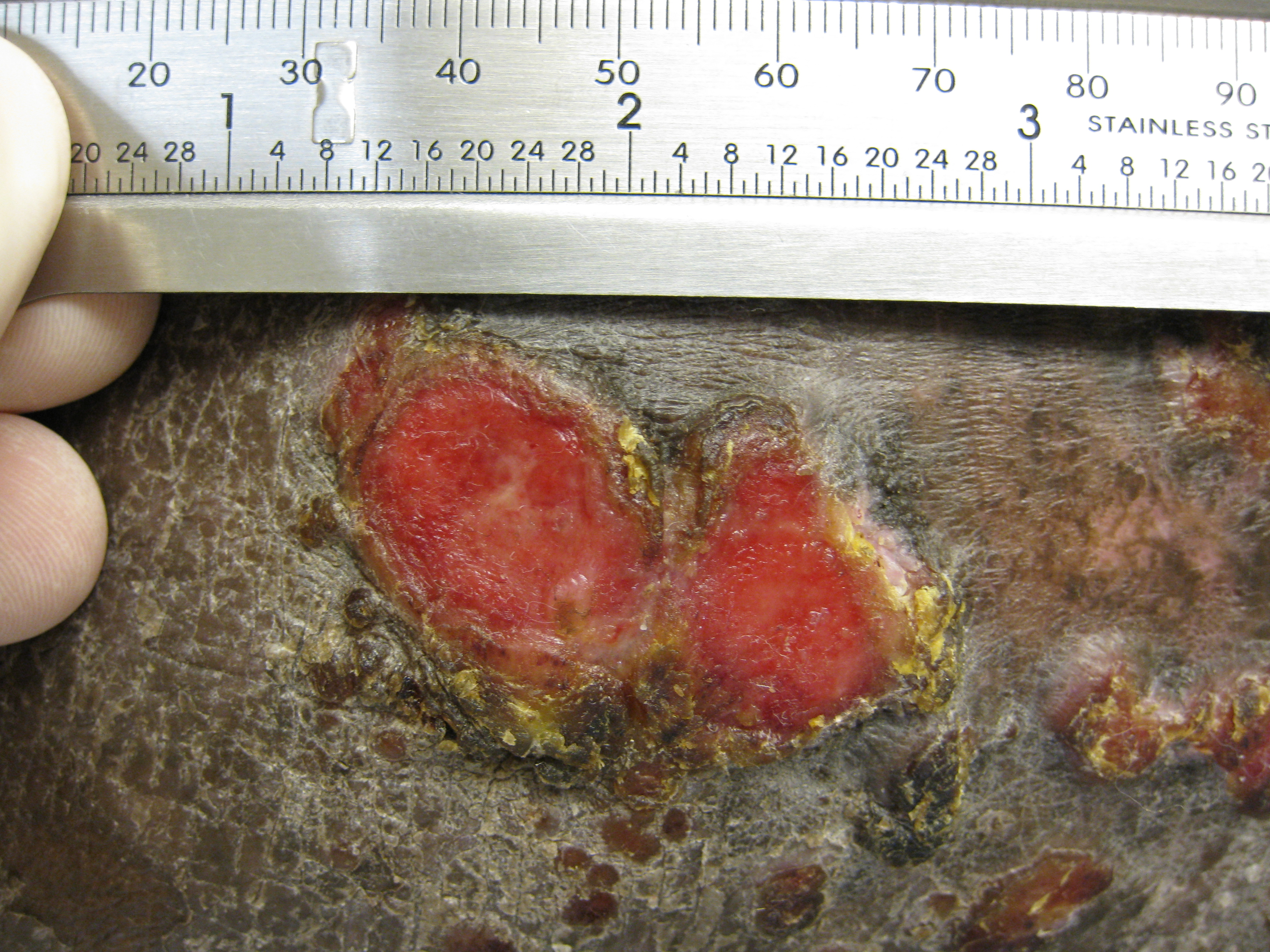
  Mycosis fungoides
- Plasmacytosis
- Pleomorphic T-cell lymphoma (non-mycosis fungoides CD30− pleomorphic small/medium-sized cutaneous T-cell lymphoma)
- Polycythemia vera (erythremia)
- Primary cutaneous follicular lymphoma (follicular center cell lymphoma, follicular center lymphoma)
- Primary cutaneous immunocytoma
- Primary cutaneous marginal zone lymphoma
- Retiform parapsoriasis
- Secondary cutaneous CD30+ large cell lymphoma
- Sézary syndrome
- Sinus histiocytosis with massive lymphadenopathy (Rosai–Dorfman disease)
- Subcutaneous T-cell lymphoma (panniculitis-like T-cell lymphoma)
- Vesiculopustular eruption and leukemoid reaction in Down syndrome

== Melanocytic nevi and neoplasms ==
Melanocytic nevi and neoplasms are caused by either a proliferation of (1) melanocytes, or (2) nevus cells, a form of melanocyte that lack dendritic processes.

- Acral nevus (melanocytic nevus of acral skin, melanocytic nevus with intraepidermal ascent of cells)
- Amelanotic blue nevus (hypomelanotic blue nevus)
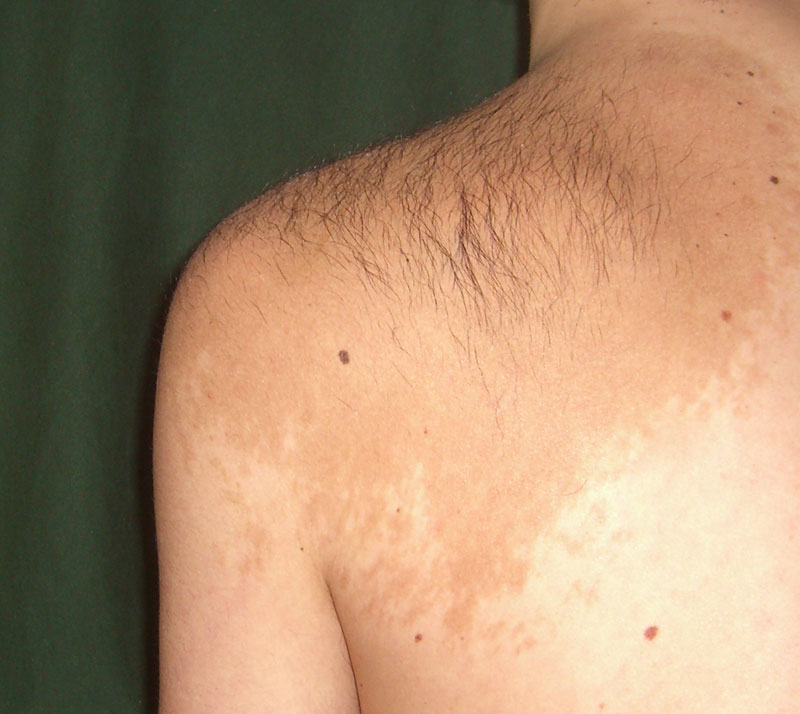
  Becker's nevus
- Balloon cell nevus
- Bannayan–Riley–Ruvalcaba syndrome
- Becker's nevus (Becker's melanosis, Becker's pigmentary hamartoma, nevoid melanosis, pigmented hairy epidermal nevus)
- Benign melanocytic nevus (banal nevus, common acquired melanocytic nevus, mole, nevocellular nevus, nevocytic nevus)
- Blue nevus (blue neuronevus, dermal melanocytoma, nevus bleu)
- Blue nevus of Jadassohn–Tièche (common blue nevus, nevus ceruleus)
- Carney complex (LAMB syndrome, NAME syndrome)
- Cellular blue nevus
- Centrofacial lentiginosis
- Congenital melanocytic nevus
- Deep penetrating nevus
- Dysplastic nevus (atypical mole, atypical nevus, B-K mole, Clark's nevus, dysplastic melanocytic nevus, nevus with architectural disorder)
- Dysplastic nevus syndrome (B-K mole syndrome, familial atypical multiple mole–melanoma syndrome, familial melanoma syndrome)
- Ephelis (freckle)
- Epithelioid blue nevus
- Generalized lentiginosis
- Giant pigmented nevus (bathing trunk nevus, congenital nevomelanocytic nevus, garment nevus, giant hairy nevus, nevus pigmentosus et pilosus)
- Halo nevus (leukoderma acquisitum centrifugum, perinevoid vitiligo, Sutton nevus)
- Hori's nevus (acquired bilateral nevus of Ota-like macules)
- Inherited patterned lentiginosis in black persons
- Ink spot lentigo (sunburn lentigo)
- Laugier–Hunziker syndrome
- Lentigo simplex (simple lentigo)
- Malignant blue nevus
- Medium-sized congenital nevocytic nevus
- Melanoacanthoma
- Melanocytic tumors of uncertain malignant potential
- Moynahan syndrome
- Mucosal lentigines (labial and penile and vulvar melanosis, melanotic macules)
- Nevus of Ito (nevus fuscoceruleus acromiodeltoideus)
- Nevus of Ota (congenital melanosis bulbi, melanosis bulborum and aberrant dermal melanocytosis, nevus fuscoceruleus ophthalmomaxillaris, oculodermal melanocytosis, oculomucodermal melanocytosis)
- Nevus spilus (speckled lentiginous nevus, zosteriform lentiginous nevus)
- Partial unilateral lentiginosis (segmental lentiginosis)
- Peutz–Jeghers syndrome
- Pigmented spindle cell nevus (pigmented spindle cell tumor of Reed, pigmented variant of Spitz nevus)
- Pseudomelanoma (recurrent melanocytic nevus, recurrent nevus)
- PUVA lentigines
- Small-sized congenital nevocytic nevus
- Spitz nevus (benign juvenile melanoma, epithelioid and spindle cell nevus, Spitz's juvenile melanoma)
- Solar lentigo (lentigo senilis, liver spot, old age spot, senile freckle)

=== Melanoma ===
Melanoma is a malignant proliferation of melanocytes and the most aggressive type of skin cancer.

- Acral lentiginous melanoma
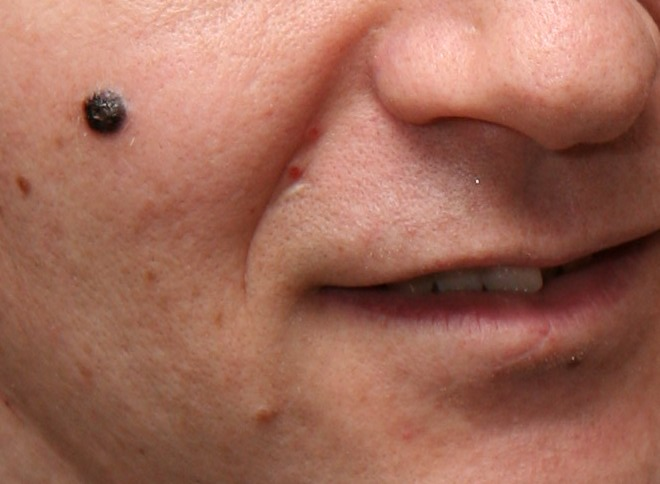
  Nodular melanoma
- Amelanotic melanoma
- Animal-type melanoma
- Desmoplastic melanoma (neurotropic melanoma, spindled melanoma)
- Lentigo maligna (lentiginous melanoma on sun-damaged skin)
- Lentigo maligna melanoma
- Melanoma with features of a Spitz nevus (Spitzoid melanoma)
- Melanoma with small nevus-like cells (small cell melanoma)
- Mucosal melanoma
- Nevoid melanoma
- Nodular melanoma
- Polypoid melanoma
- Seborrheic keratosis-like melanoma
- Soft-tissue melanoma (clear-cell sarcoma, melanoma of the soft parts)
- Superficial spreading melanoma (superficially spreading melanoma)
- Uveal melanoma

== Monocyte- and macrophage-related ==
Monocyte- and macrophage-related cutaneous conditions are characterized histologically by infiltration of the skin by monocyte or macrophage cells, often divided into several categories, including granulomatous disease, histiocytoses, and sarcoidosis.

- Actinic granuloma (O'Brien granuloma)
- Annular elastolytic giant cell granuloma (giant cell elastophagocytosis, Meischer's granuloma, Miescher's granuloma of the face)
- Annular sarcoidosis
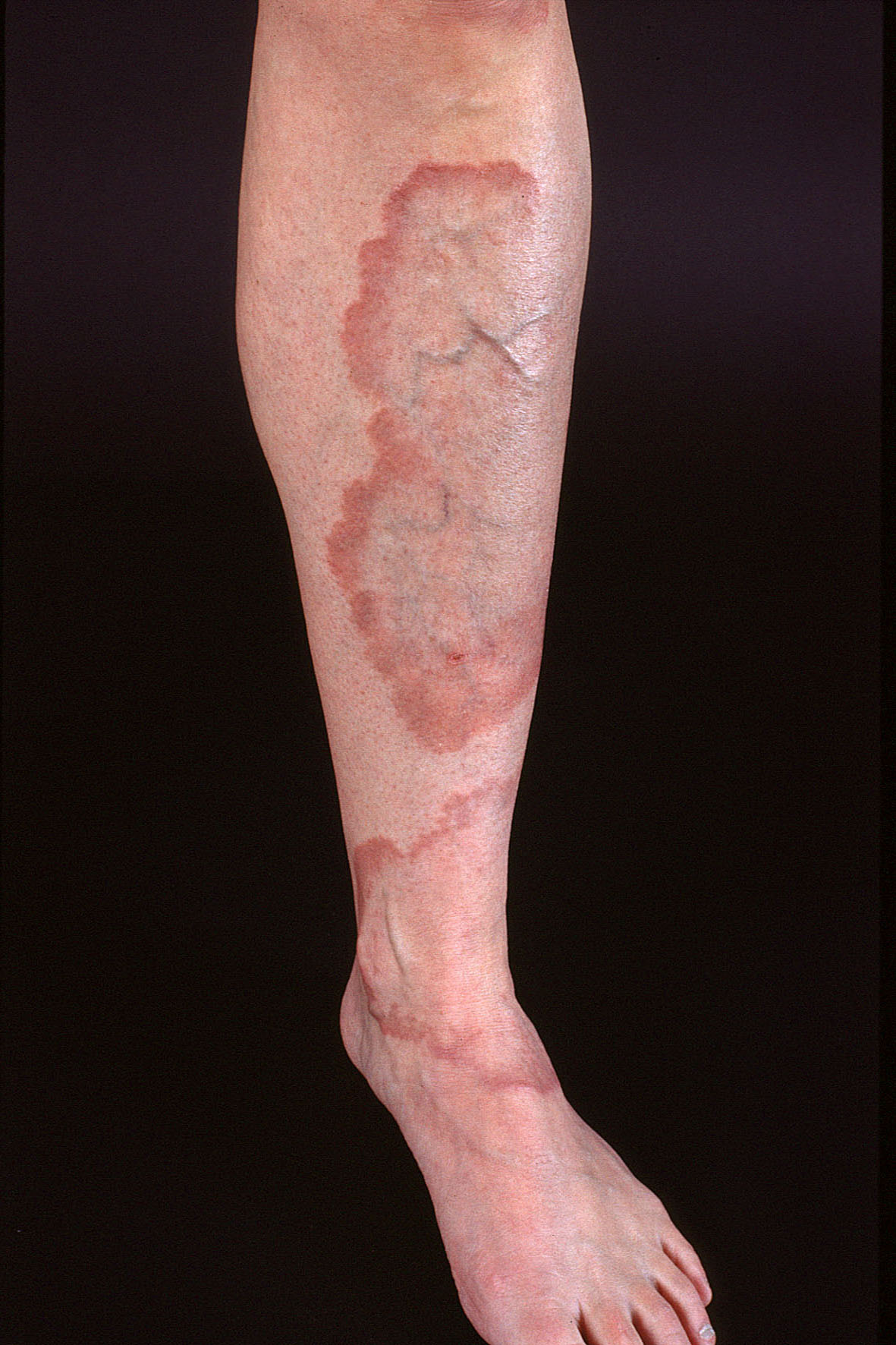
  Generalized granuloma annulare
- Benign cephalic histiocytosis (histiocytosis with intracytoplasmic worm-like bodies)
- Congenital self-healing reticulohistiocytosis (Hashimoto–Pritzker disease, Hashimoto–Pritzker syndrome)
- Erythrodermic sarcoidosis
- Generalized eruptive histiocytoma (eruptive histiocytoma, generalized eruptive histiocytosis)
- Generalized granuloma annulare
- Giant cell reticulohistiocytoma (solitary reticulohistiocytoma, solitary reticulohistiocytosis)
- Granuloma annulare in HIV disease
- Granuloma multiforme (Mkar disease, granuloma multiforme (Leiker))
- Hand–Schüller–Christian disease
- Heerfordt's syndrome
- Hereditary progressive mucinous histiocytosis
- Hypopigmented sarcoidosis
- Ichthyosiform sarcoidosis
- Indeterminate cell histiocytosis
- Interstitial granulomatous drug reaction
- Langerhans cell histiocytosis (histiocytosis X)
- Letterer–Siwe disease
- Localized granuloma annulare
- Löfgren syndrome
- Lupus pernio
- Morpheaform sarcoidosis
- Mucosal sarcoidosis
- Multicentric reticulohistiocytosis
- Necrobiotic xanthogranuloma (necrobiotic xanthogranuloma with paraproteinemia)
- Non-X histiocytosis
- Papular sarcoid
- Papular xanthoma
- Patch-type granuloma annulare (macular granuloma annulare)
- Perforating granuloma annulare
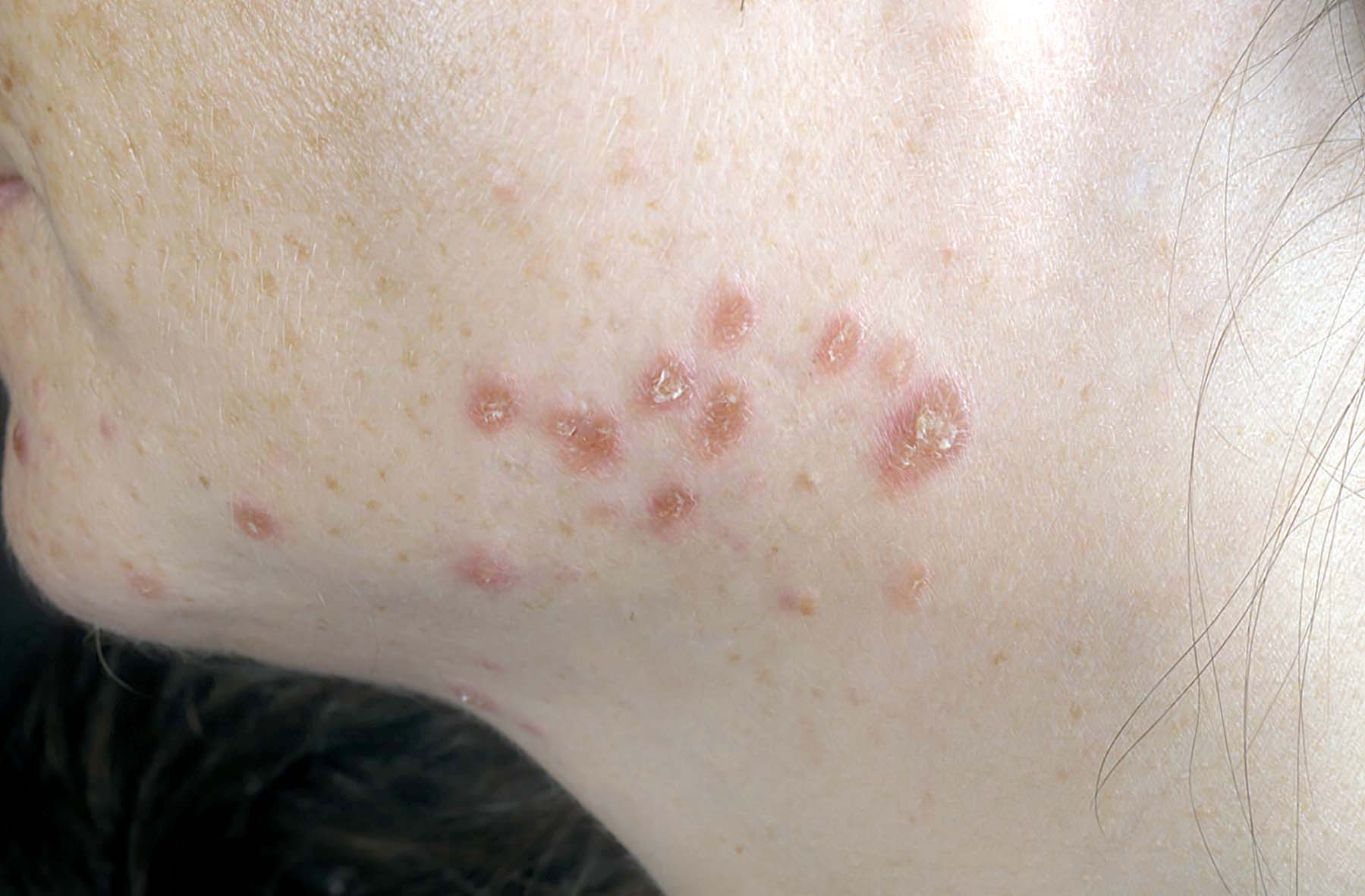
  Systemic sarcoidosis
- Progressive nodular histiocytosis
- Reticulohistiocytoma
- Scar sarcoid (sarcoidosis in scars)
- Sea-blue histiocytosis
- Subcutaneous granuloma annulare (deep granuloma annulare, pseudorheumatoid nodule)
- Subcutaneous sarcoidosis (Darier–Roussy disease, Darier–Roussy sarcoid)
- Systemic sarcoidosis
- Ulcerative sarcoidosis
- Xanthoma disseminatum (disseminated xanthosiderohistiocytosis, Montgomery syndrome)

== Mucinoses ==
Mucinoses are a group of conditions caused by dermal fibroblasts producing abnormally large amounts of mucopolysaccharides.

- Acral persistent papular mucinosis
- Atypical lichen myxedematosus (intermediate lichen myxedematosus)
- Atypical tuberous myxedema (Jadassohn–Dosseker syndrome)
- Cutaneous focal mucinosis
- Cutaneous lupus mucinosis (papular and nodular mucinosis in lupus erythematosus, papular and nodular mucinosis of Gold, papulonodular mucinosis in lupus erythematosus)
- Discrete papular lichen myxedematosus
- Eccrine mucinosis
- Follicular mucinosis (alopecia mucinosa, mucinosis follicularis, Pinkus' follicular mucinosis, Pinkus' follicular mucinosis–benign primary form)
- Localized lichen myxedematosus
- Myxoid cyst (digital mucous cyst, mucous cyst)
- Myxoid lipoblastoma
- Neuropathia mucinosa cutanea
- Nodular lichen myxedematosus
- Papular mucinosis (generalized lichen myxedematosus, sclerodermoid lichen myxedematosus, scleromyxedema)
- Papular mucinosis of infancy (cutaneous mucinosis of infancy)
- Perifollicular mucinosis
- Reticular erythematous mucinosis (midline mucinosis, plaque-like cutaneous mucinosis, REM syndrome)
- Scleroderma
- Self-healing juvenile cutaneous mucinosis
- Self-healing papular mucinosis
- Stiff skin syndrome (congenital fascial dystrophy)

== Neurocutaneous ==
Neurocutaneous conditions are due organic nervous system disease or are psychiatric in etiology.

- Atypical chronic pain syndrome
- Body dysmorphic disorder (dysmorphic syndrome, dysmorphophobia)
- Brachioradial pruritus
- Bromidrosiphobia
- Complex regional pain syndrome (reflex sympathetic dystrophy)
- Congenital insensitivity to pain with anhidrosis
- Delusional parasitosis (delusions of parasitosis, Ekbom syndrome, monosymptomatic hypochondriacal psychosis)
- Dermatothlasia
- Dermatitis artefacta (factitious dermatitis, factitial dermatitis)
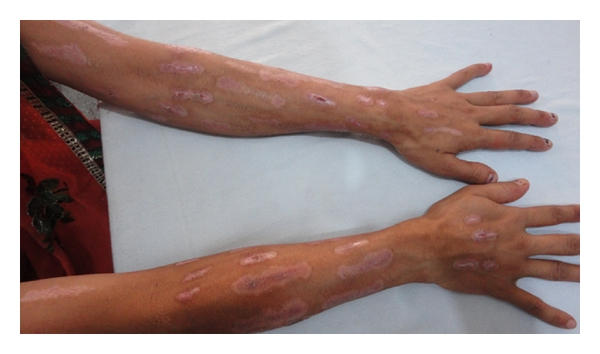
  Factitious dermatitis
- Glossodynia (burning mouth syndrome, burning tongue, orodynia)
- Levator ani syndrome
- Malum perforans pedis (neurotrophic ulcer, perforating ulcer of the foot)
- Meralgia paresthetica (Roth–Bernhardt disease)
- Neurotic excoriations
- Notalgia paresthetica (hereditary localized pruritus, posterior pigmented pruritic patch, subscapular pruritus)
- Postencephalitic trophic ulcer
- Psychogenic pruritus
- Riley–Day syndrome (familial dysautonomia)
- Scalp dysesthesia
- Sciatic nerve injury
- Scrotodynia
- Syringomyelia (Morvan's disease)
- Traumatic neuroma (amputation neuroma)
- Trichotillomania (trichotillosis)
- Trigeminal neuralgia (tic douloureux)
- Trigeminal trophic lesion (trigeminal trophic syndrome)
- Vulvodynia (vestibulodynia)

== Noninfectious immunodeficiency-related ==
Noninfectious immunodeficiency-related cutaneous conditions are caused by T-cell or B-cell dysfunction.

- Bare lymphocyte syndrome
- Chronic granulomatous disease (Bridges–Good syndrome, chronic granulomatous disorder, Quie syndrome)
- Common variable immunodeficiency (acquired hypogammaglobulinemia)
- Complement deficiency
- DiGeorge syndrome (DiGeorge anomaly, thymic hypoplasia)
- Graft-versus-host disease
- Griscelli syndrome
- Hyper-IgE syndrome (Buckley syndrome, Job syndrome)
- Immunodeficiency with hyper-IgM
- Immunodeficiency–centromeric instability–facial anomalies syndrome (ICF syndrome)
- Isolated IgA deficiency
- Isolated primary IgM deficiency
- Janus kinase 3 deficiency
- Leukocyte adhesion molecule deficiency
- LIG4 syndrome
- Myeloperoxidase deficiency
- Neutrophil immunodeficiency syndrome
- Nezelof syndrome (thymic dysplasia with normal immunoglobulins)
- Omenn syndrome
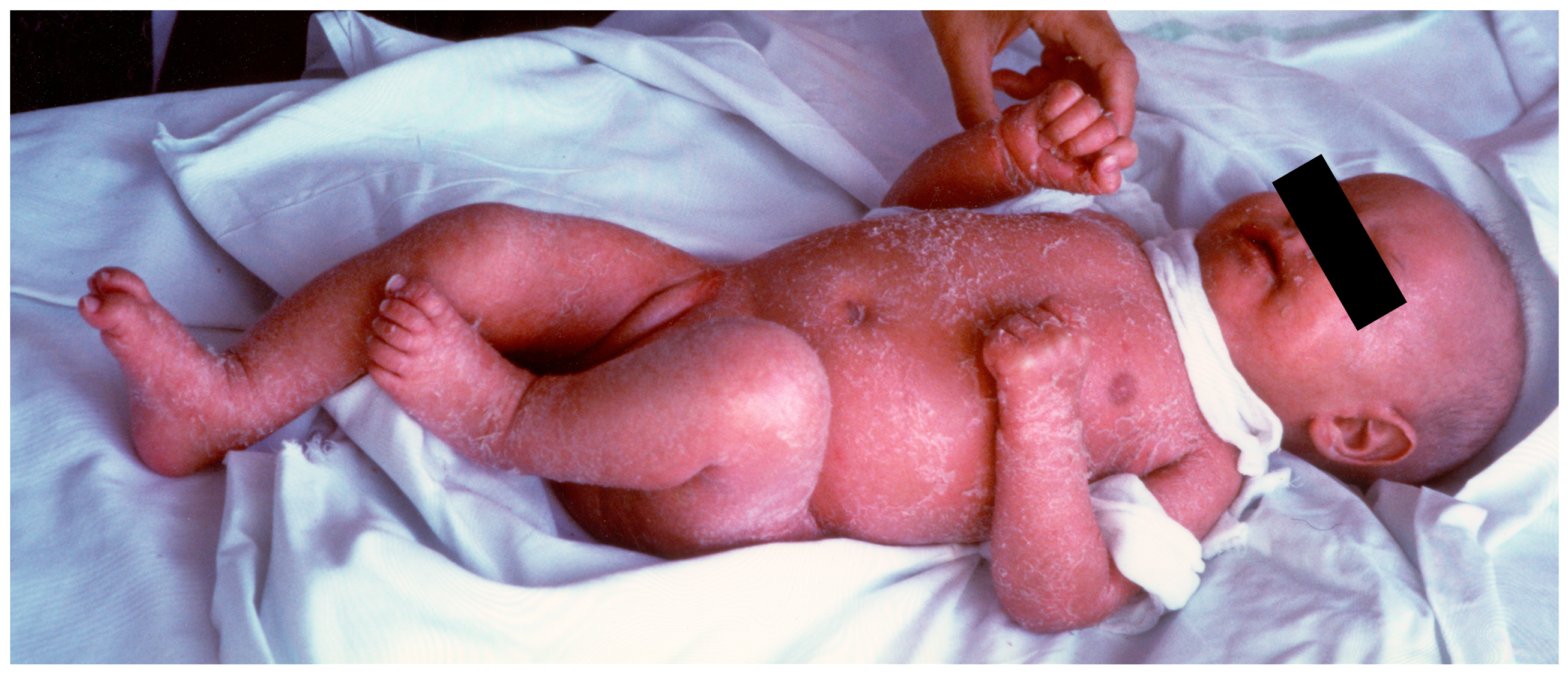
  Omenn syndrome
- Purine nucleoside phosphorylase deficiency
- Severe combined immunodeficiency (alymphocytosis, Glanzmann–Riniker syndrome, severe mixed immunodeficiency syndrome, thymic alymphoplasia)
- Shwachman–Bodian–Diamond syndrome
- Thymoma with immunodeficiency (Good syndrome)
- Transient hypogammaglobulinemia of infancy
- Warts–hypogammaglobulinemia–infections–myelokathexis syndrome (WHIM syndrome)
- Wiskott–Aldrich syndrome
- X-linked agammaglobulinemia (Bruton syndrome, sex-linked agammaglobulinemia)
- X-linked hyper-IgM syndrome
- X-linked hypogammaglobulinemia
- X-linked lymphoproliferative disease (Duncan's disease)
- X-linked neutropenia

== Nutrition-related ==
Nutrition-related cutaneous conditions are caused by malnutrition due to an improper or inadequate diet.

- Biotin deficiency
- Carotenemia
- Essential fatty acid deficiency
- Folic acid deficiency
- Hypervitaminosis A
- Hypovitaminosis A (phrynoderma)
- Iron deficiency
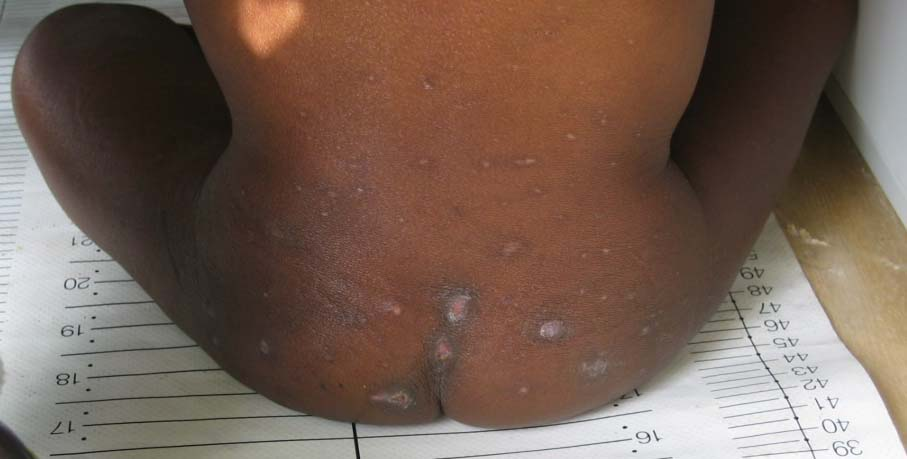
  Kwashiorkor
- Kwashiorkor
- Lycopenemia
- Maple syrup urine disease
- Marasmus
- Niacin deficiency (pellagra, vitamin B_{3} deficiency)
- Selenium deficiency
- Vitamin B_{1} deficiency (beriberi, thiamine deficiency)
- Vitamin B_{12} deficiency (cyanocobalamin deficiency)
- Vitamin B_{2} deficiency (ariboflavinosis, riboflavin deficiency)
- Vitamin B_{6} deficiency (pyridoxine deficiency)
- Vitamin B_{6} excess (pyridoxine excess)
- Vitamin C deficiency (scurvy)
- Vitamin K deficiency
- Zinc deficiency

== Papulosquamous hyperkeratotic ==
Papulosquamous hyperkeratotic cutaneous conditions are those that present with papules and scales caused by a thickening of the stratum corneum.

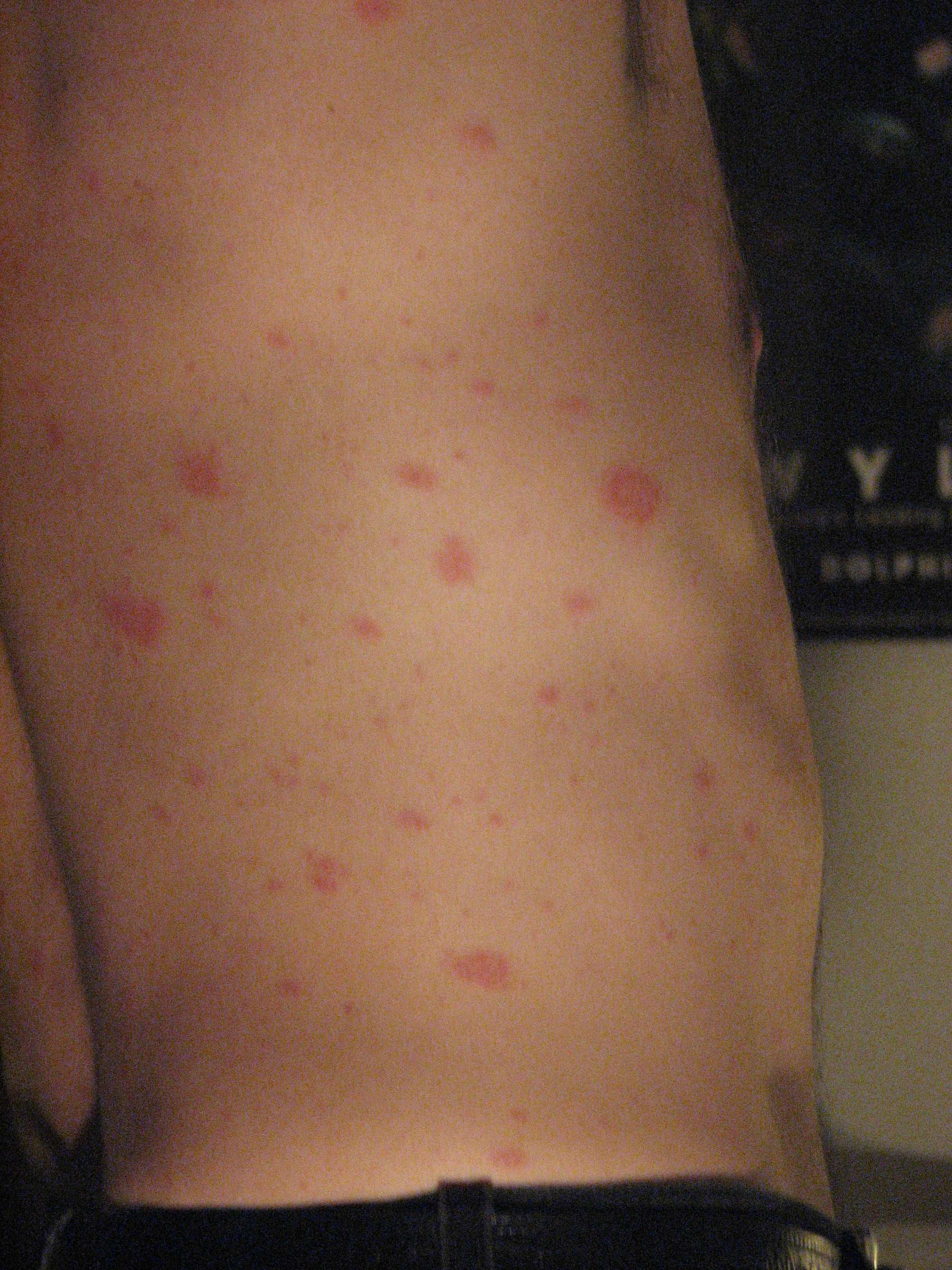
Pityriasis rosea

- Confluent and reticulated papillomatosis (confluent and reticulated papillomatosis of Gougerot and Carteaud, familial cutaneous papillomatosis, familial occurrence of confluent and reticulated papillomatosis)
- Digitate dermatosis
- Drug-induced keratoderma
- Exfoliative dermatitis (dermatitis exfoliativa, erythroderma, red man syndrome)
- Florid cutaneous papillomatosis
- Granular parakeratosis (axillary granular parakeratosis, intertriginous granular parakeratosis)
- Keratolysis exfoliativa (lamellar dyshidrosis, recurrent focal palmar peeling, recurrent palmar peeling)
- Keratosis punctata of the palmar creases (hyperkeratosis penetrans, hyperkeratosis punctata, keratodermia punctata, keratosis punctata, keratotic pits of the palmar creases, lenticular atrophia of the palmar creases, punctate keratosis of the palmar creases)
- Meesmann corneal dystrophy
- Paraneoplastic keratoderma
- Pityriasis rosea (pityriasis rosea Gibert)
- Pityriasis rubra pilaris (Devergie's disease, lichen ruber acuminatus, lichen ruber pilaris)
- Pure hair-nail type ectodermal dysplasia
- Small plaque parapsoriasis (chronic superficial dermatitis)
- Tripe palms
- Xanthoerythrodermia perstans

=== Palmoplantar keratodermas ===
Palmoplantar keratodermas are a diverse group of hereditary and acquired keratodermas in which there is hyperkeratosis of the skin of the palms and soles.

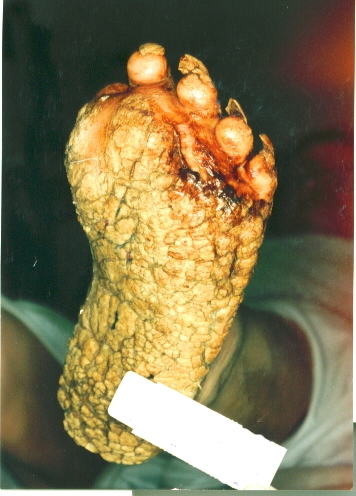
Palmoplantar keratoderma

- Acrokeratoelastoidosis of Costa (keratoelastoidosis marginalis)
- Aquagenic keratoderma (acquired aquagenic palmoplantar keratoderma, aquagenic syringeal acrokeratoderma, aquagenic wrinkling of the palms, transient reactive papulotranslucent acrokeratoderma)
- Bart–Pumphrey syndrome (palmoplantar keratoderma with knuckle pads and leukonychia and deafness)
- Camisa disease
- Carvajal syndrome (striate palmoplantar keratoderma with woolly hair and cardiomyopathy, striate palmoplantar keratoderma with woolly hair and left ventricular dilated cardiomyopathy)
- Corneodermatoosseous syndrome (CDO syndrome)
- Diffuse epidermolytic palmoplantar keratoderma (palmoplantar keratoderma cum degeneratione granulosa Vörner, Vörner's epidermolytic palmoplantar keratoderma, Vörner keratoderma)
- Diffuse nonepidermolytic palmoplantar keratoderma (diffuse orthohyperkeratotic keratoderma, hereditary palmoplantar keratoderma, keratosis extremitatum progrediens, keratosis palmoplantaris diffusa circumscripta, tylosis, Unna–Thost disease, Unna–Thost keratoderma)
- Erythrokeratodermia variabilis (erythrokeratodermia figurata variabilis, keratosis extremitatum progrediens, keratosis palmoplantaris transgrediens et progrediens, Mendes da Costa syndrome, Mendes da Costa type erythrokeratodermia, progressive symmetric erythrokeratoderma)
- Focal acral hyperkeratosis (acrokeratoelastoidosis lichenoides, degenerative collagenous plaques of the hand)
- Focal palmoplantar and gingival keratosis
- Focal palmoplantar keratoderma with oral mucosal hyperkeratosis (focal epidermolytic palmoplantar keratoderma, hereditary painful callosities, hereditary painful callosity syndrome, keratosis follicularis, keratosis palmoplantaris nummularis, nummular epidermolytic palmoplantar keratoderma)
- Haim–Munk syndrome (palmoplantar keratoderma with periodontitis and arachnodactyly and acro-osteolysis)
- Hidrotic ectodermal dysplasia (alopecia congenita with keratosis palmoplantaris, Clouston syndrome, Clouston's hidrotic ectodermal dysplasia, Fischer–Jacobsen–Clouston syndrome, keratosis palmaris with drumstick fingers, palmoplantar keratoderma and clubbing)
- Howel–Evans syndrome (familial keratoderma with carcinoma of the esophagus, focal non-epidermolytic palmoplantar keratoderma with carcinoma of the esophagus, palmoplantar ectodermal dysplasia type III, palmoplantar keratoderma associated with esophageal cancer, tylosis, tylosis–esophageal carcinoma)
- Hystrix-like ichthyosis–deafness syndrome (HID syndrome)
- Keratoderma climactericum (acquired plantar keratoderma, climacteric keratoderma, Haxthausen's disease)
- Keratosis punctata palmaris et plantaris (Buschke–Fischer–Brauer disease, Davis Colley disease, keratoderma disseminatum palmaris et plantaris, keratosis papulosa, keratoderma punctatum, keratodermia punctata, keratoma hereditarium dissipatum palmare et plantare, palmar and plantar seed dermatoses, palmar keratoses, papulotranslucent acrokeratoderma, punctate keratoderma, punctate keratoses of the palms and soles, maculosa disseminata)
- Keratitis–ichthyosis–deafness syndrome (erythrokeratodermia progressiva Burns, ichthyosiform erythroderma with corneal involvement and deafness, KID syndrome)
- Mal de Meleda (acral keratoderma, Gamborg–Nielsen keratoderma, mutilating palmoplantar keratoderma of the Gamborg–Nielsen type, palmoplantar ectodermal dysplasia type VIII, palmoplantar keratoderma of the Norrbotten type)
- Naxos syndrome (diffuse non-epidermolytic palmoplantar keratoderma with woolly hair and cardiomyopathy, diffuse palmoplantar keratoderma with woolly hair and arrhythmogenic right ventricular cardiomyopathy of Naxos, Naxos disease)
- Olmsted syndrome (mutilating palmoplantar keratoderma with periorificial keratotic plaques, mutilating palmoplantar keratoderma with periorificial plaques, polykeratosis of Touraine)
- Pachyonychia congenita type I (Jadassohn–Lewandowsky syndrome)
- Pachyonychia congenita type II (Jackson–Lawler pachyonychia congenita, Jackson–Sertoli syndrome)
- Palmoplantar keratoderma and spastic paraplegia (Charcot–Marie–Tooth disease with palmoplantar keratoderma and nail dystrophy)
- Palmoplantar keratoderma of Sybert (Greither palmoplantar keratoderma, Greither syndrome, keratosis extremitatum hereditaria progrediens, keratosis palmoplantaris transgrediens et progrediens, Sybert keratoderma, transgrediens and progrediens palmoplantar keratoderma)
- Papillon–Lefèvre syndrome (palmoplantar keratoderma with periodontitis)
- Porokeratosis plantaris discreta
- Punctate palmoplantar keratoderma
- Schöpf–Schulz–Passarge syndrome (eyelid cysts with palmoplantar keratoderma and hypodontia and hypotrichosis)
- Scleroatrophic syndrome of Huriez (Huriez syndrome, palmoplantar keratoderma with scleroatrophy, palmoplantar keratoderma with sclerodactyly, scleroatrophic and keratotic dermatosis of the limbs, sclerotylosis)
- Striate palmoplantar keratoderma (acral keratoderma, Brünauer–Fuhs–Siemens type of palmoplantar keratoderma, focal non-epidermolytic palmoplantar keratoderma, keratosis palmoplantaris varians, palmoplantar keratoderma areata, palmoplantar keratoderma striata, Wachter keratoderma, Wachters palmoplantar keratoderma)
- Spiny keratoderma (porokeratosis punctata palmaris et plantaris, punctate keratoderma, punctate porokeratosis of the palms and soles)
- Tyrosinemia type II (oculocutaneous tyrosinemia, Richner–Hanhart syndrome)
- Vohwinkel syndrome (keratoderma hereditaria mutilans, keratoma hereditaria mutilans, mutilating keratoderma of Vohwinkel, mutilating palmoplantar keratoderma)

== Pregnancy-related ==
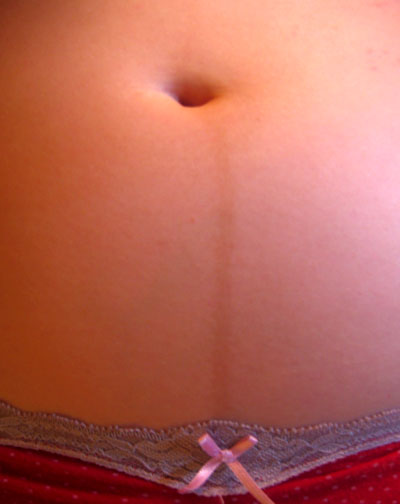
Linea nigra

Pregnancy-related cutaneous conditions are a group of skin changes observed during pregnancy.

- Impetigo herpetiformis
- Intrahepatic cholestasis of pregnancy (cholestasis of pregnancy, jaundice of pregnancy, obstetric cholestasis, prurigo gravidarum)
- Linea nigra
- Pemphigoid gestationis (gestational pemphigoid, herpes gestationis)
- Prurigo gestationis (Besnier prurigo, early-onset prurigo of pregnancy, linear IgM dermatosis of pregnancy, papular dermatitis of pregnancy, prurigo of pregnancy, Spangler's papular dermatitis of pregnancy)
- Pruritic folliculitis of pregnancy
- Pruritic urticarial papules and plaques of pregnancy (late-onset prurigo of pregnancy, polymorphic eruption of pregnancy, PUPPP syndrome, toxemic rash of pregnancy, toxic erythema of pregnancy)
- Striae gravidarum

== Pruritic ==
Pruritus, commonly known as itchiness, is a sensation exclusive to the skin, and characteristic of many skin conditions.

- Adult blaschkitis
- Aquadynia
- Aquagenic pruritus
- Biliary pruritus
- Cholestatic pruritus
- Drug-induced pruritus
- Hydroxyethyl starch-induced pruritus
- Lichen simplex chronicus (neurodermatitis)
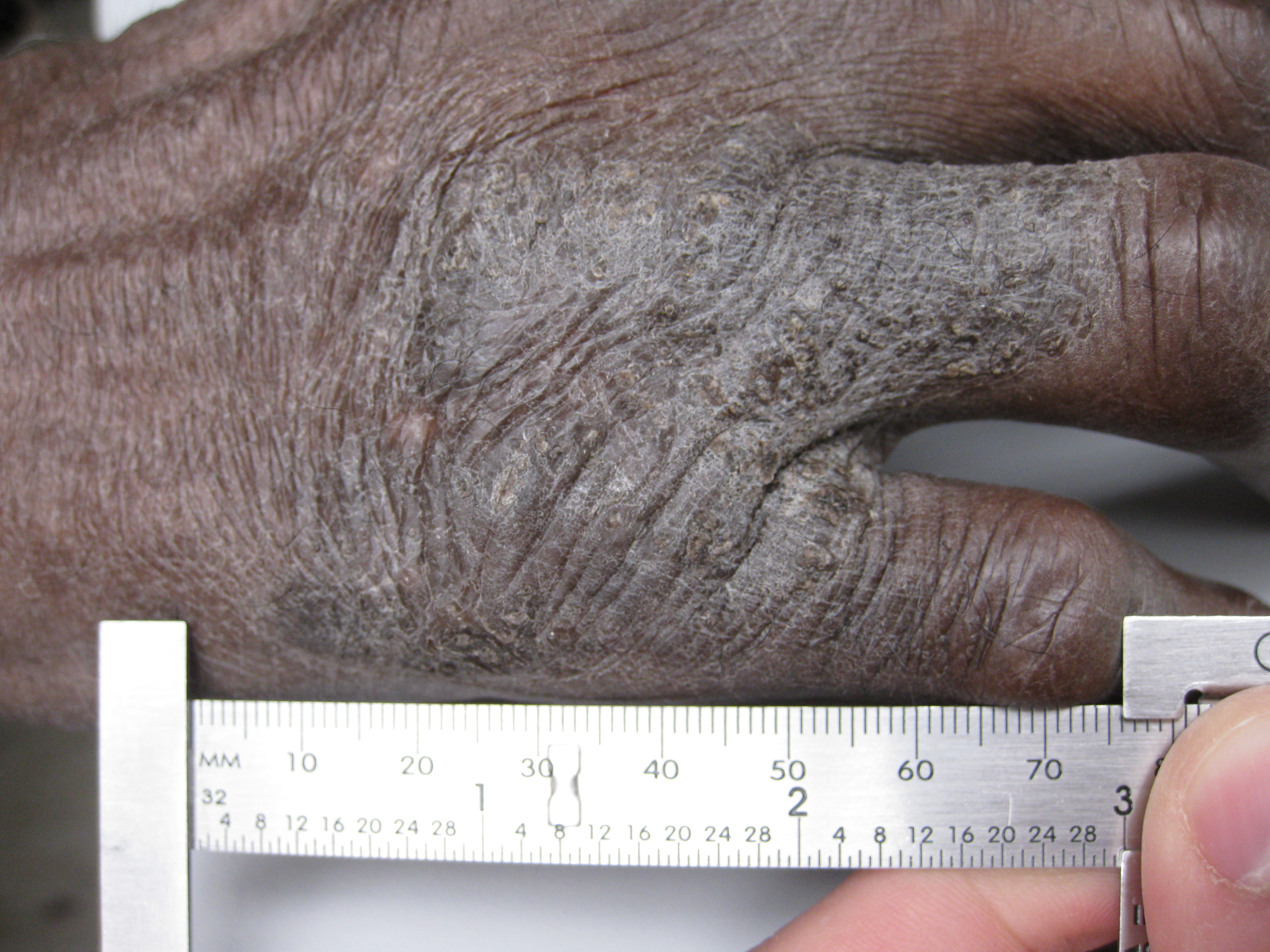
  Lichen simplex chronicus
- Prion pruritus
- Prurigo nodularis
- Prurigo pigmentosa
- Prurigo simplex
- Pruritus ani
- Pruritus scroti
- Pruritus vulvae
- Puncta pruritica (itchy points)
- Scalp pruritus
- Senile pruritus
- Uremic pruritus (renal pruritus)

== Psoriasis ==
Psoriasis is a common, chronic, and recurrent inflammatory disease of the skin characterized by circumscribed, erythematous, dry, scaling plaques.

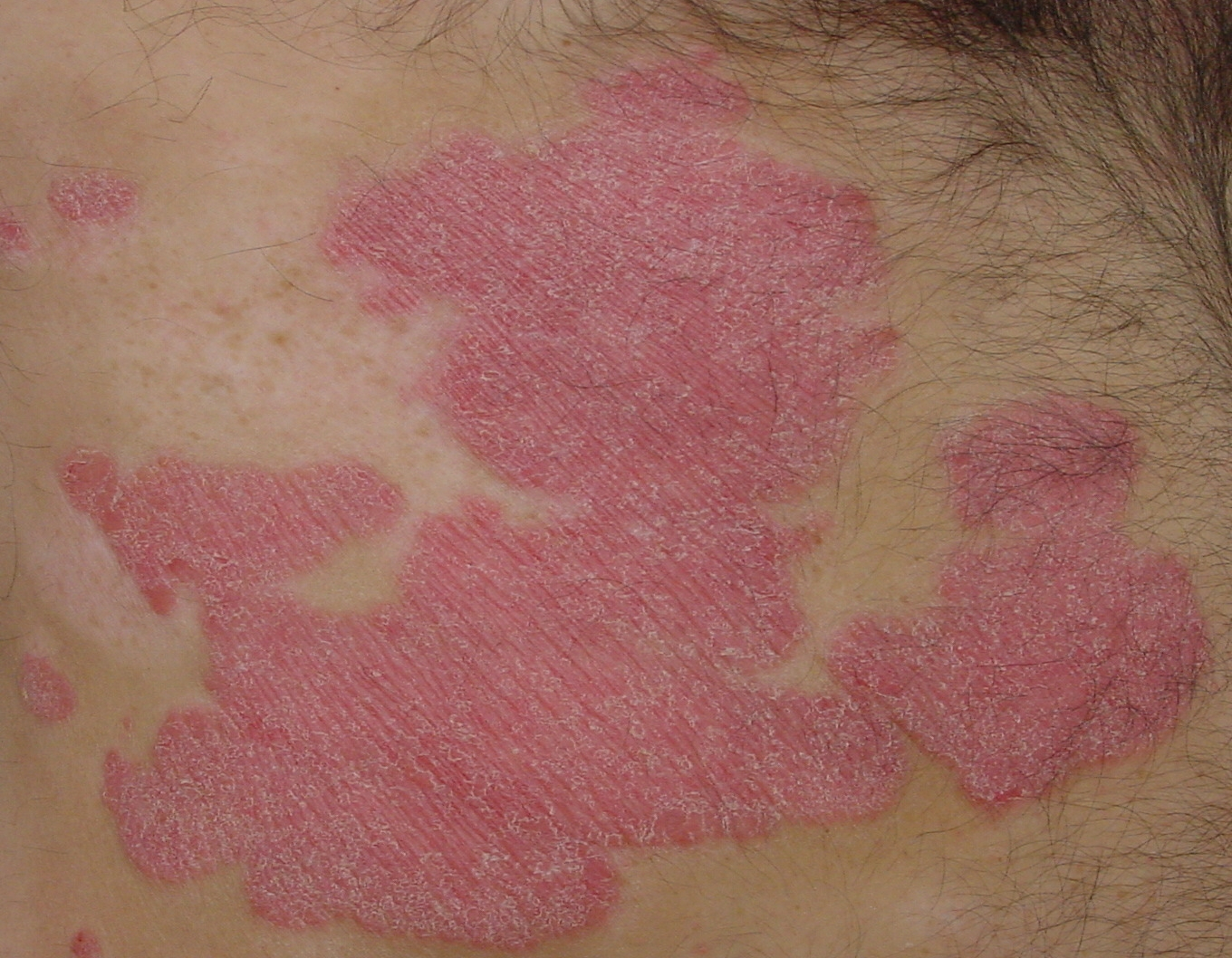
Psoriasis vulgaris

- Annular pustular psoriasis
- Drug-induced psoriasis
- Exanthematic pustular psoriasis
- Generalized pustular psoriasis (pustular psoriasis of von Zumbusch)
- Guttate psoriasis (eruptive psoriasis)
- Inverse psoriasis
- Keratoderma blennorrhagica (keratoderma blennorrhagicum)
- Localized pustular psoriasis
- Napkin psoriasis
- Psoriasis vulgaris (chronic stationary psoriasis, plaque-like psoriasis)
- Psoriatic arthritis
- Psoriatic erythroderma (erythrodermic psoriasis)
- Seborrheic-like psoriasis (sebopsoriasis, seborrhiasis)

== Reactive neutrophilic ==
Reactive neutrophilic cutaneous conditions constitute a spectrum of disease mediated by neutrophils, and typically associated with underlying diseases, such as inflammatory bowel disease and hematologic malignancy.

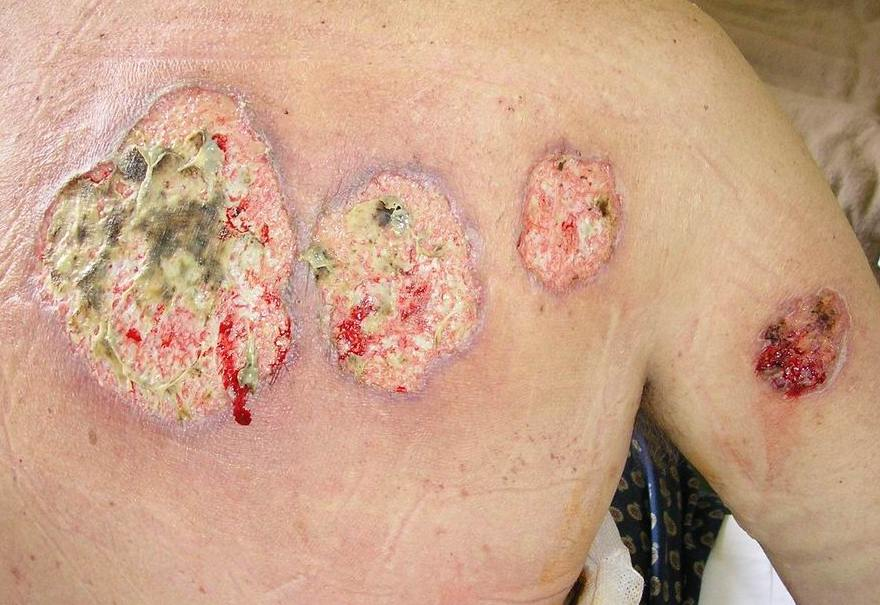
Pyoderma gangrenosum

- Acute erythema nodosum
- Bowel-associated dermatosis–arthritis syndrome (bowel bypass syndrome, bowel bypass syndrome without bowel bypass, intestinal bypass arthritis–dermatitis syndrome)
- Marshall syndrome
- Neutrophilic dermatosis of the dorsal hands (pustular vasculitis of the dorsal hands)
- Neutrophilic eccrine hidradenitis
- Pyoderma gangrenosum
- Pyogenic arthritis–pyoderma gangrenosum–acne syndrome (PAPA syndrome)
- Rheumatoid neutrophilic dermatitis (rheumatoid neutrophilic dermatosis)
- Superficial granulomatous pyoderma
- Sweet's syndrome (acute febrile neutrophilic dermatosis)
- Sweet's syndrome-like dermatosis
- Vesicopustular dermatosis

== Recalcitrant palmoplantar eruptions ==
Recalcitrant palmoplantar eruptions are skin conditions of the palms and soles which are resistant to treatment.

- Dermatitis repens (acrodermatitis continua, acrodermatitis continua of Hallopeau, acrodermatitis continua suppurativa Hallopeau, acrodermatitis perstans, dermatitis repens Crocker, Hallopeau's acrodermatitis, Hallopeau's acrodermatitis continua, pustular acrodermatitis)
- Infantile acropustulosis (acropustulosis of infancy)
- Palmoplantar pustulosis (persistent palmoplantar pustulosis, pustular psoriasis of the Barber type, pustular psoriasis of the extremities, pustulosis of palms and soles, pustulosis palmaris et plantaris)
- Pustular bacterid

== Resulting from errors in metabolism ==
Skin conditions resulting from errors in metabolism are caused by enzymatic defects that lead to an accumulation or deficiency of various cellular components, including, but not limited to, amino acids, carbohydrates, and lipids.

- Acute intermittent porphyria
- Adrenoleukodystrophy (Schilder's disease)
- Alkaptonuria
- Aminolevulinic acid dehydratase deficiency porphyria (Doss porphyria, plumboporphyria)
- B-mannosidase deficiency
- Carotenosis
- Cerebral autosomal dominant arteriopathy with subcortical infarcts and leukoencephalopathy syndrome (CADASIL syndrome)
- Cerebrotendinous xanthomatosis
- Citrullinemia
- Congenital erythropoietic porphyria (Gunther's disease)
- Diabetic bulla (bullosis diabeticorum, bullous eruption of diabetes mellitus)
- Diabetic cheiroarthropathy
- Diabetic dermopathy (shin spots)
- Dystrophic calcinosis cutis
- Eruptive xanthoma
- Erythropoietic protoporphyria
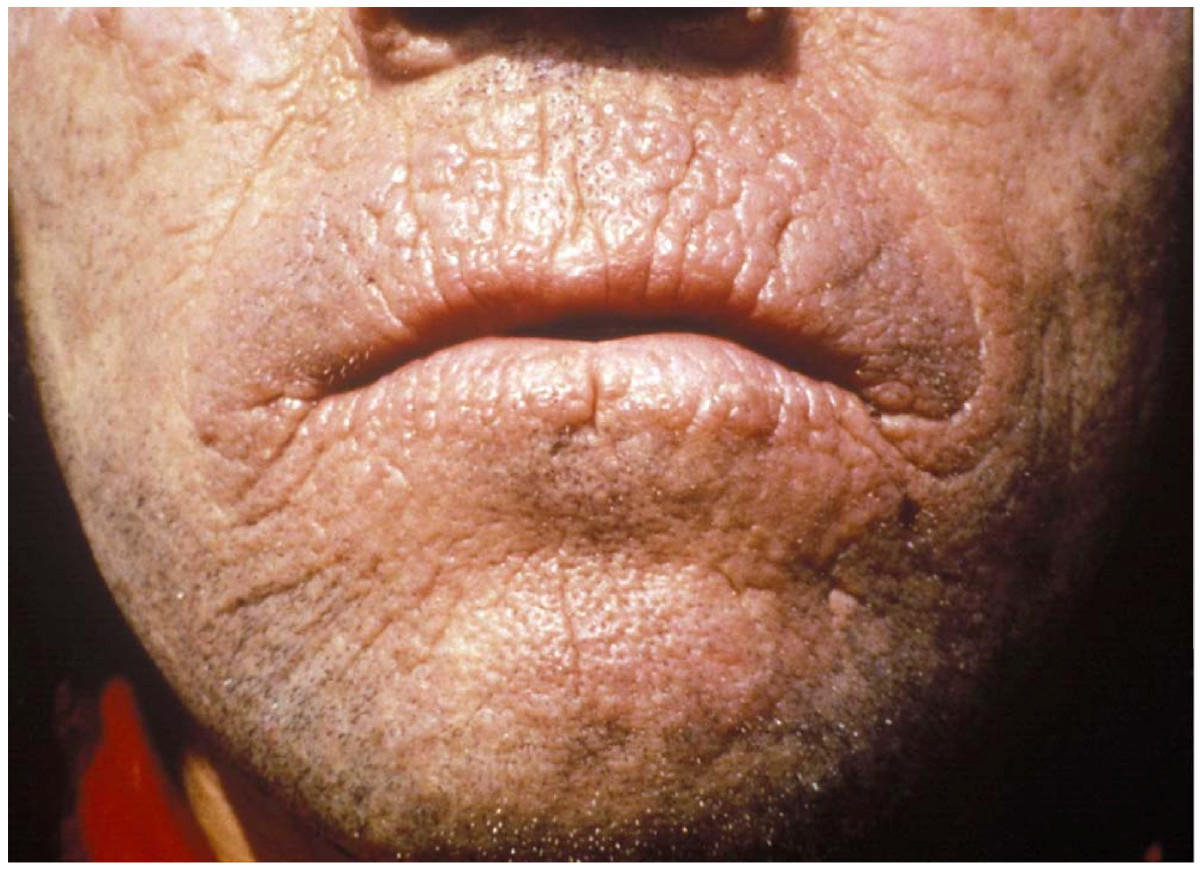
  Erythropoietic protoporphyria
- Fabry disease (Anderson–Fabry disease, angiokeratoma corporis diffusum)
- Familial alpha-lipoprotein deficiency (Tangier disease)
- Familial amyloid polyneuropathy
- Familial apoprotein CII deficiency
- Familial combined hyperlipidemia (multiple-type hyperlipoproteinemia)
- Familial defective apolipoprotein B-100
- Familial dysbetalipoproteinemia (broad beta disease, remnant removal disease)
- Familial hypertriglyceridemia
- Farber disease (fibrocytic dysmucopolysaccharidosis, lipogranulomatosis)
- Fucosidosis
- Gaucher's disease
- Gout (podagra, urate crystal arthropathy, urate deposition disease)
- Hartnup disease (pellagra-like dermatosis)
- Hemodialysis-associated amyloidosis
- Hepatoerythropoietic porphyria
- Hereditary coproporphyria
- Hereditary gelsolin amyloidosis
- Heredofamilial amyloidosis
- Hunter syndrome
- Hurler syndrome (gargoylism, mucopolysaccharidosis type I)
- Hurler–Scheie syndrome (mucopolysaccharidosis type I H-S)
- Hyaluronidase deficiency (mucopolysaccharidosis type IX)
- Iatrogenic calcinosis cutis
- Idiopathic scrotal calcinosis (idiopathic calcified nodules of the scrotum)
- Lafora disease
- Lesch–Nyhan syndrome (juvenile gout)
- Lichen amyloidosis
- Limited joint mobility
- Lipoid proteinosis (hyalinosis cutis et mucosae, Urbach–Wiethe disease)
- Lipoprotein lipase deficiency (chylomicronemia, chylomicronemia syndrome)
- Macular amyloidosis
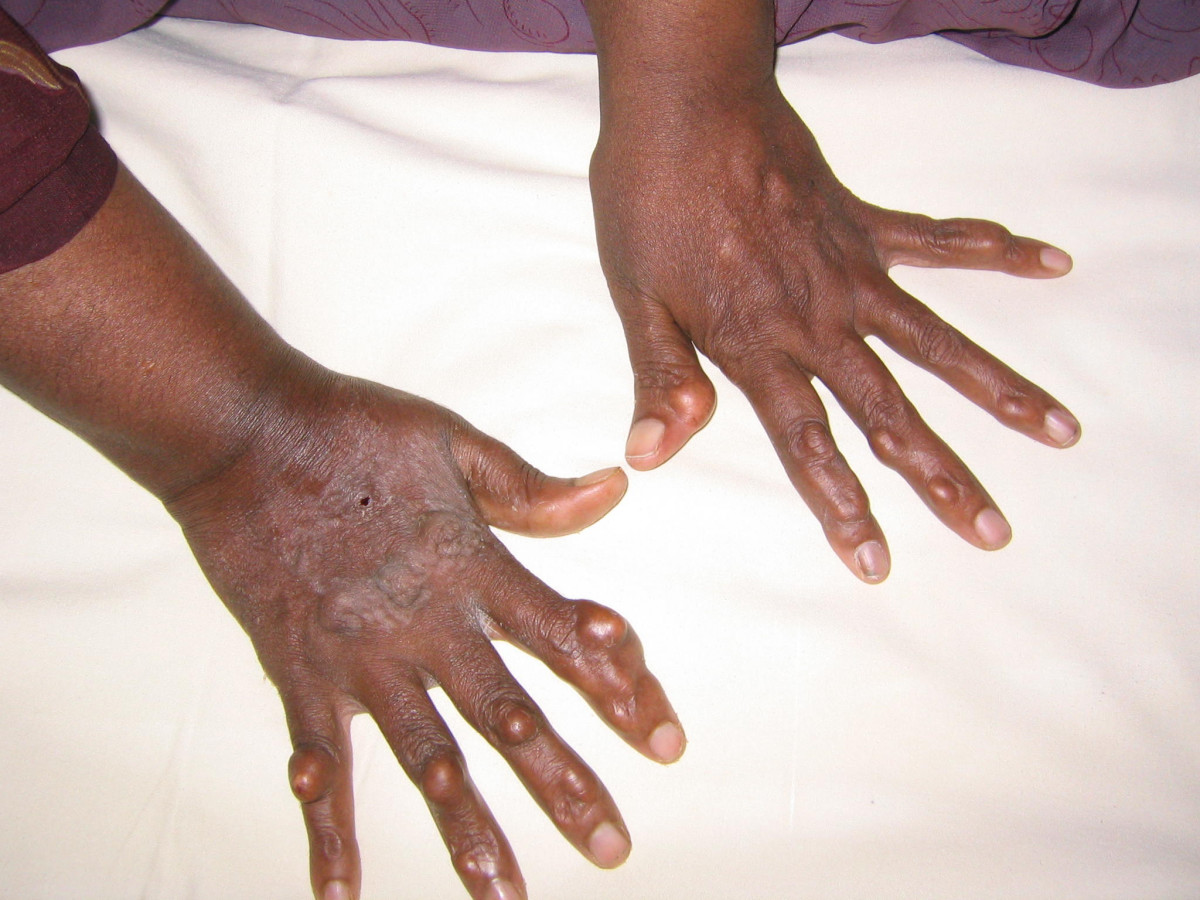
  Xanthoma tendinosum
- Maroteaux–Lamy syndrome (mucopolysaccharidosis type VI)
- Medication-induced hyperlipoproteinemia
- Metastatic calcinosis cutis
- Milia-like calcinosis
- Morquio's disease (mucopolysaccharidosis type IV)
- Necrobiosis lipoidica (necrobiosis lipoidica diabeticorum)
- Niemann–Pick disease
- Nodular amyloidosis
- Nodular xanthoma
- Normolipoproteinemic xanthomatosis
- Obstructive liver disease (xanthomatous biliary cirrhosis)
- Ochronosis
- Osteoma cutis
- Palmar xanthoma
- Phenylketonuria
- Phytosterolemia (sitosterolemia)
- Porphyria cutanea tarda
- Primary cutaneous amyloidosis
- Primary systemic amyloidosis
- Prolidase deficiency
- Pseudoporphyria (pseudoporphyria cutanea tarda)
- Sanfilippo syndrome
- Scheie syndrome (mucopolysaccharidosis type I S)
- Secondary cutaneous amyloidosis
- Secondary systemic amyloidosis
- Sialidosis
- Sly syndrome (mucopolysaccharidosis type VII)
- Subepidermal calcified nodule (solitary congenital nodular calcification, Winer's nodular calcinosis)
- Transient erythroporphyria of infancy (purpuric phototherapy-induced eruption)
  Xanthelasma palpebrarum
- Traumatic calcinosis cutis
- Tuberoeruptive xanthoma (tuberous xanthoma)
- Tumoral calcinosis
- Variegate porphyria (mixed hepatic porphyria, mixed porphyria, South African genetic porphyria, South African porphyria)
- Verruciform xanthoma
- Waxy skin
- Wilson's disease (hepatolenticular degeneration)
- Xanthelasma palpebrarum (xanthelasma)
- Xanthoma diabeticorum
- Xanthoma planum (plane xanthoma)
- Xanthoma striatum palmare
- Xanthoma tendinosum (tendinous xanthoma)
- Xanthoma tuberosum

== Resulting from physical factors ==
Skin conditions resulting from physical factors occur from a number of causes, including, but not limited to, hot and cold temperatures, friction, and moisture.

- Abrasion
- Acrocyanosis
- Actinic prurigo (familial polymorphous light eruption of American Indians, hereditary polymorphous light eruption of American Indians, Hutchinson's summer prurigo, hydroa aestivale)
- Aerosol burn
- Benign summer light eruption
- Beryllium granuloma
- Black heel and palm (black heel, calcaneal petechiae, chromidrose plantaire, post-traumatic punctate intraepidermal hemorrhage, tache noir)
- Callus (callosity, clavus, corn, heloma, heloma durum, heloma molle, intractable plantar keratosis, tyloma)
- Carbon stain
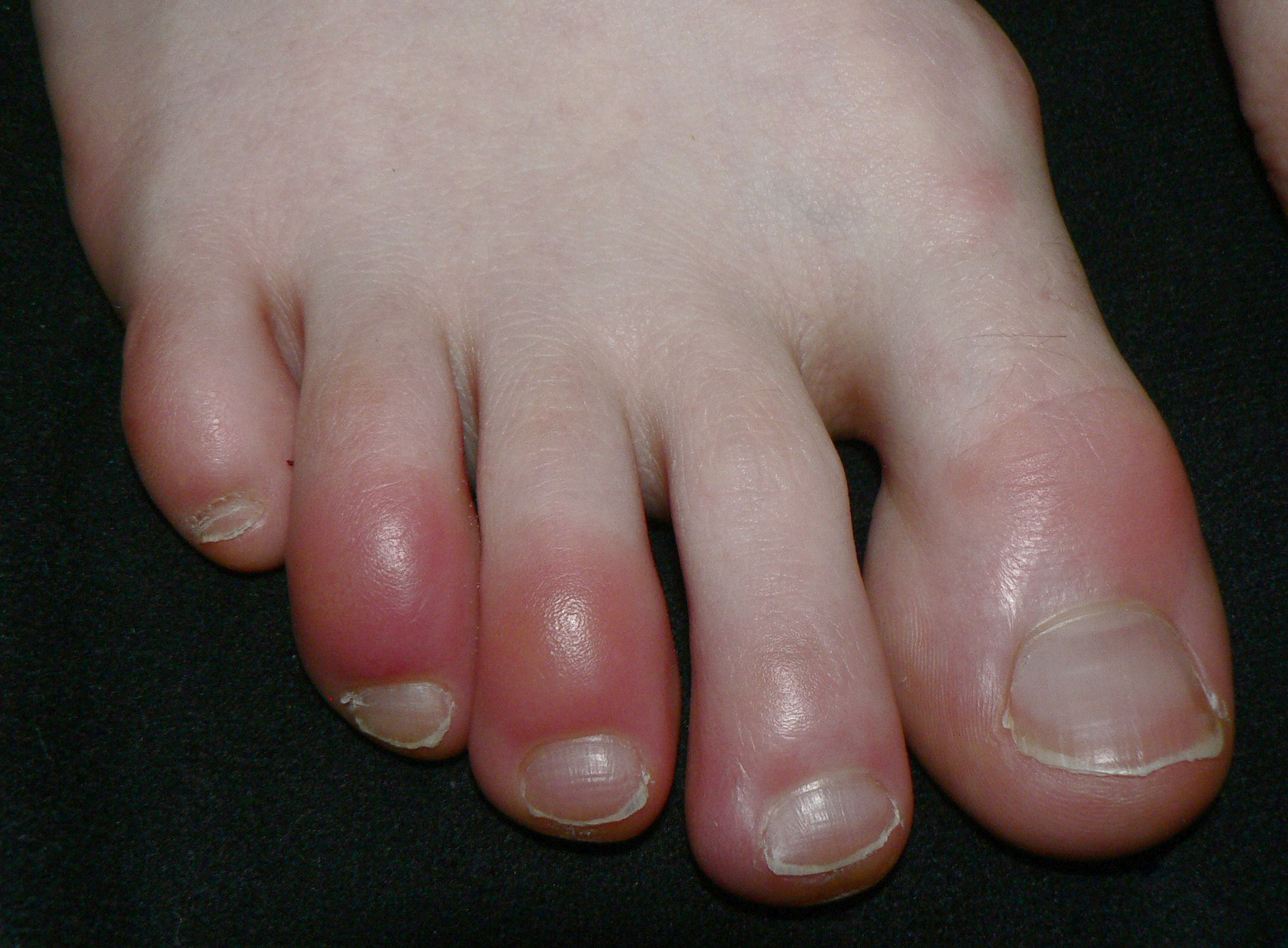
  Chilblains
- Chilblains (pernio, perniosis)
- Chronic actinic dermatitis (actinic reticuloid, chronic photosensitivity dermatitis, persistent light reactivity, photosensitive eczema)
- Colloid milium
- Coma blister
- Delayed blister
- Dermatosis neglecta
- Edema blister (edema bulla, hydrostatic bulla, stasis blister)
- Electrical burn
- Equestrian perniosis
- Erythema ab igne (fire stains, toasted skin syndrome)
- Erythrocyanosis crurum
- Favre–Racouchot syndrome (Favre–Racouchot disease, nodular cutaneous elastosis with cysts and comedones)
- Foreign body reaction
- Fracture blister
- Friction blister
- Frostbite
- Garrod's pad (violinist's pad)
- Harpist's finger
- Heel stick wound
- Heat edema
- Hot tar burn
- Hunan hand syndrome (chili burn)
- Hydroa vacciniforme (Bazin's hydroa vacciniforme)
- Jogger's nipple
- Juvenile spring eruption
- Kairo cancer
- Kang cancer
- Kangri ulcer
- Lightning burn
- Loop mark
- Magnetic resonance imaging burn (MRI burn)
- Mercury granuloma
- Miliaria crystallina (miliaria crystalline, sudamina)
- Miliaria profunda (mammillaria)
- Miliaria pustulosa
- Miliaria rubra (heat rash, prickly heat)
- Narcotic dermopathy
- Occlusion miliaria
- Painful fat herniation (painful piezogenic pedal papules, piezogenic papules)
- Peat fire cancer
- Photoaging (dermatoheliosis)
- Photosensitivity with HIV infection
- Phototoxic tar dermatitis
- Photosenitization
- Phytophotodermatitis (Berloque dermatitis)
- Pinch mark
- Polymorphous light eruption (polymorphic light eruption)
- Postmiliarial hypohidrosis
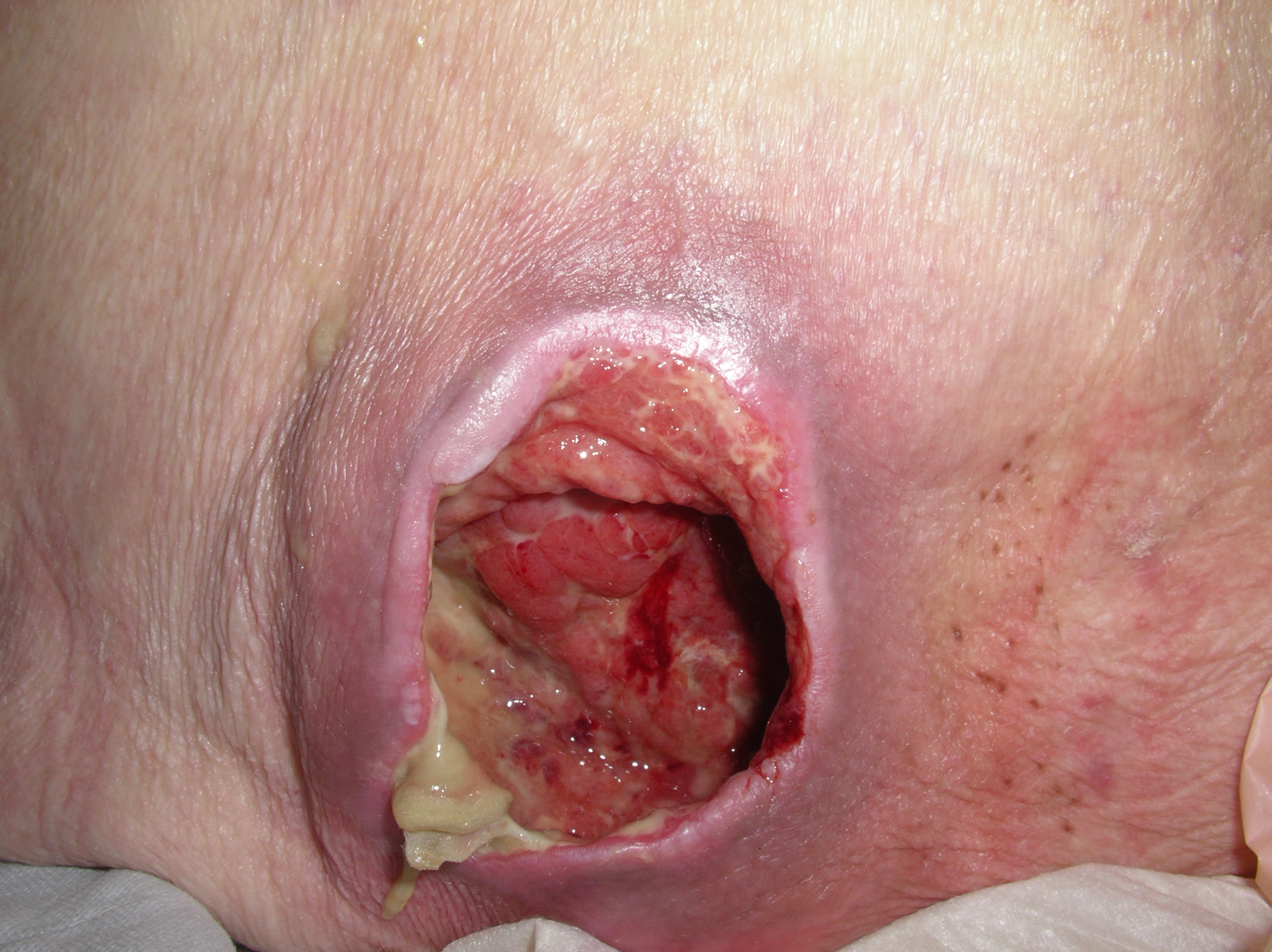
  Pressure ulcer
- Postoperative hematoma
- Pressure ulcer (decubitus ulcer)
- Pseudoacanthosis nigricans
- Pseudoverrucous papules and nodules
- Pulling boat hands
- PUVA-induced acrobullous dermatosis
- Runner's rump
- Sclerosing lymphangiitis
- Silica granuloma
- Silicone granuloma
- Skin pop scar
- Skin track
- Slap mark
- Solar erythema
- Soot tattoo
- Subcutaneous emphysema
- Sucking blister
- Sunburn
  - Hell's itch
- Surfer's knots
- Talon noir
- Tattoo
- Tennis toe
- Thermal burn
- Traumatic asphyxia
- Trench foot
- Tropical anhidrotic asthenia
- Tropical immersion foot (paddy foot, paddy-field foot)
- Turf toe
- Uranium dermatosis
- UV-sensitive syndrome
- Vibration white finger (dead finger, hand–arm vibration syndrome)
- Warm water immersion foot
- Weathering nodule of ear
- Wrestler's ear (cauliflower ear, traumatic auricular hematoma)
- Zirconium granuloma

=== Ionizing radiation-induced ===
Ionizing radiation-induced cutaneous conditions result from exposure to ionizing radiation.

- Acute radiodermatitis
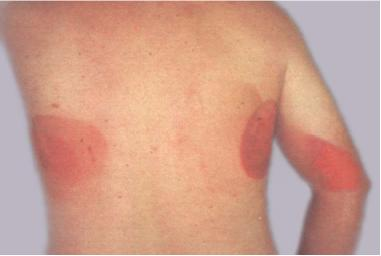
  Fluoroscopy burn
- Chronic radiation keratosis
- Chronic radiodermatitis
- Eosinophilic, polymorphic, and pruritic eruption associated with radiotherapy
- Fluoroscopy burn
- Radiation acne
- Radiation cancer
- Radiation dermatitis (radiodermatitis)
- Radiation recall reaction
- Radiation-induced erythema multiforme
- Radiation-induced hypertrophic scar
- Radiation-induced keloid
- Radiation-induced morphea

== Urticaria and angioedema ==
Urticaria is a vascular reaction of the skin characterized by the appearance of wheals, which are firm, elevated swellings of the skin. Angioedema, which can occur alone or with urticaria, is characterized by a well-defined, edematous swelling that involves subcutaneous tissues, abdominal organs, or upper airway.

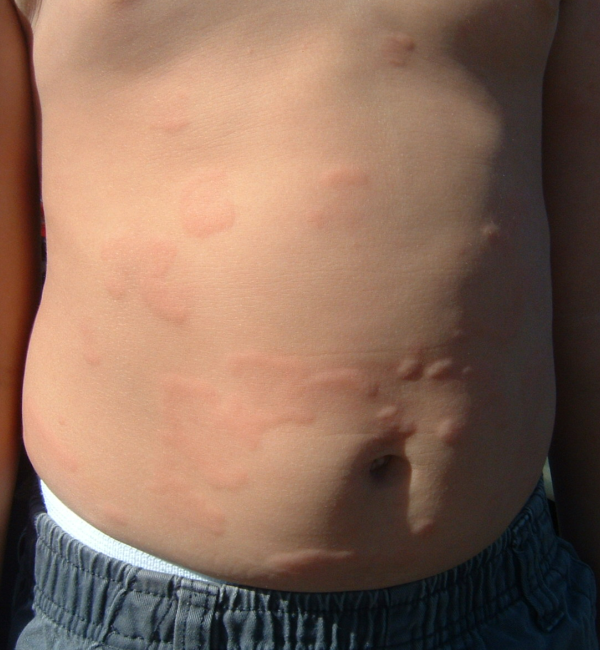
Acute urticaria

- Acquired C1 esterase inhibitor deficiency
- Acute urticaria
- Adrenergic urticaria
- Anaphylaxis
- Aquagenic urticaria
- Autoimmune urticaria
- Cholinergic urticaria
- Chronic urticaria (ordinary urticaria)
- Cold urticaria
- Dermatographism (dermographism)
- Episodic angioedema with eosinophilia (Gleich's syndrome)
- Exercise urticaria (exercise-induced urticaria)
- Galvanic urticaria
- Heat urticaria
- Hereditary angioedema (Quincke's edema)
- Localized heat contact urticaria
- Mast cell-independent urticaria
- Physical urticaria
- Primary cold contact urticaria
- Pressure urticaria (delayed pressure urticaria)
- Reflex cold urticaria
- Schnitzler syndrome
- Secondary cold contact urticaria
- Solar urticaria
- Systemic capillary leak syndrome
- Urticarial allergic eruption
- Urticaria-like follicular mucinosis
- Vibratory angioedema

== Vascular-related ==
Vascular-related cutaneous conditions result from dysfunction of the blood or blood vessels in the dermis, or lymphatics in the subcutaneous tissues.

- Aagenaes syndrome
- Acroangiodermatitis (acroangiodermatitis of Mali, Mali acroangiodermatitis, Pseudo-Kaposi's sarcoma)
- Acrocyanosis
- Acute hemorrhagic edema of infancy (acute hemorrhagic edema of childhood, Finkelstein's disease, infantile postinfectious iris-like purpura and edema, medallion-like purpura, purpura en cocarde avec oedema, Seidlmayer syndrome)
- Arterial insufficiency ulcer (ischemic ulcer)
- Arteriosclerosis obliterans
- Bier spots
- Blueberry muffin baby
- Bonnet–Dechaume–Blanc syndrome (Wyburn–Mason syndrome)
- Bullous lymphedema
- Bullous small vessel vasculitis (bullous variant of small vessel vasculitis)
- Calciphylaxis
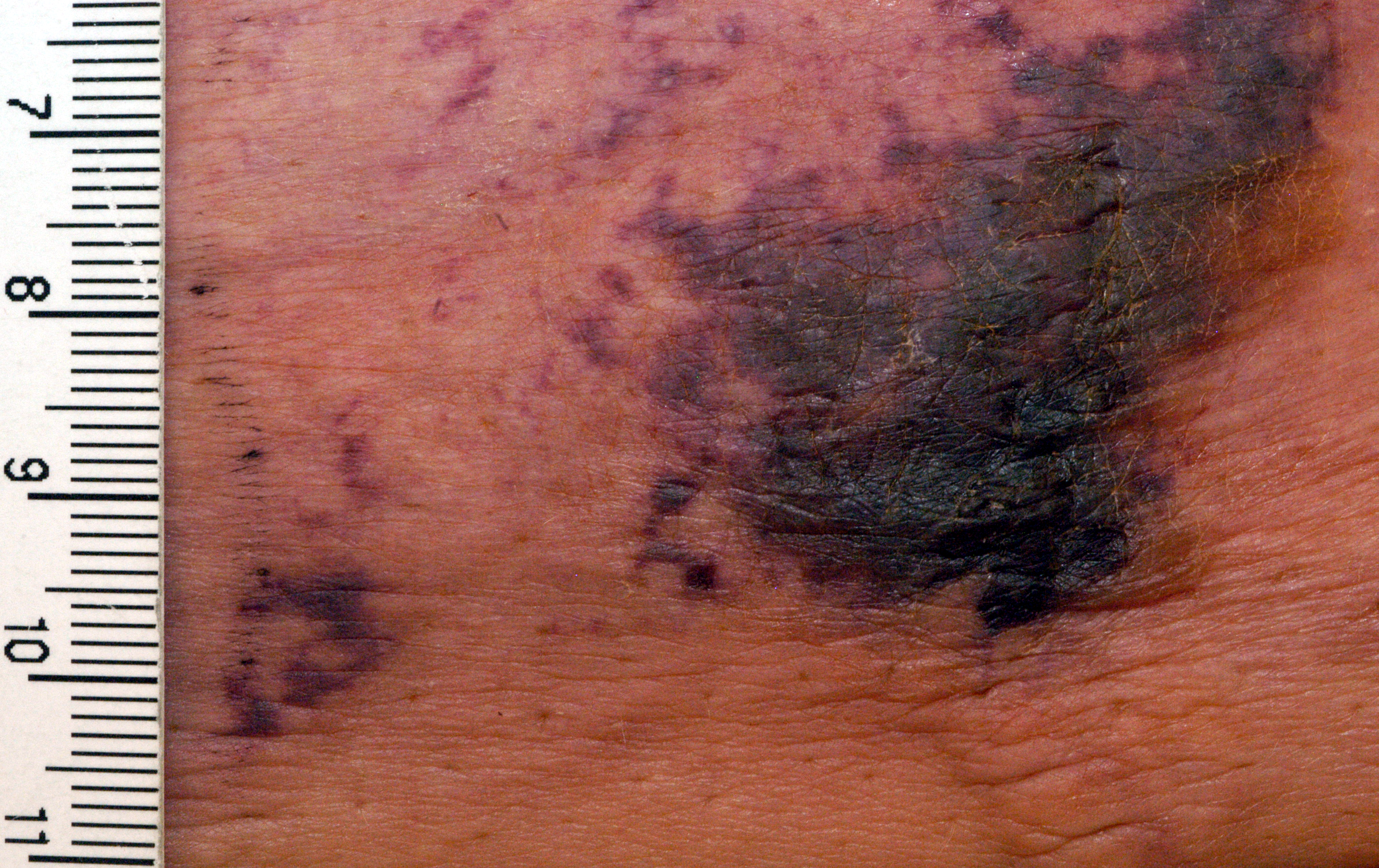
  Calciphylaxis
- Caput succedaneum
- Cholesterol embolus (warfarin blue toe syndrome)
- Cobb syndrome
- Corona phlebectatica
- Cryofibrinogenemic purpura
- Cryoglobulinemic purpura
- Cryoglobulinemic vasculitis
- Cutaneous small-vessel vasculitis (cutaneous leukocytoclastic angiitis, cutaneous leukocytoclastic vasculitis, cutaneous necrotizing venulitis, hypersensitivity angiitis)
- Deep venous thrombosis
- Disseminated intravascular coagulation
- Doucas and Kapetanakis pigmented purpura
- Drug-induced purpura
- Drug-induced thrombocytopenic purpura
- Eczematid-like purpura of Doucas and Kapetanakis
- Epidemic dropsy
- Erythema elevatum diutinum
- Erythromelalgia (acromelalgia, erythermalgia)
- Factitial lymphedema (hysterical edema)
- Fibrinolysis syndrome (defibrinating syndrome, hypofibrinogenemia)
- Food-induced purpura
- Generalized essential telangiectasia (general essential telangiectasia)
- Giant-cell arteritis
- Gougerot–Blum syndrome (pigmented purpuric lichenoid dermatitis, pigmented purpuric lichenoid dermatitis of Gougerot and Blum)
- Granulomatosis with polyangiitis
- Harlequin color change
- Hematopoietic ulcer
- Hennekam syndrome (Hennekam lymphangiectasia-lymphedema syndrome, intestinal lymphagiectasia-lymphedema-mental retardation syndrome)
- Henoch–Schönlein purpura (anaphylactoid purpura, purpura rheumatica, Schönlein–Henoch purpura)
  Henoch–Schönlein purpura
- Hereditary hemorrhagic telangiectasia (Osler's disease, Osler–Weber–Rendu disease)
- Idiopathic thrombocytopenic purpura (autoimmune thrombocytopenic purpura, Werlhof's disease)
- IgA vasculitis
- Kawasaki's disease (mucocutaneous lymph node syndrome)
- Levamisole-induced vasculitis
- Lichen aureus (lichen purpuricus)
- Livedo racemosa
- Livedo reticularis
- Livedoid dermatitis (embolia cutis medicamentosa, Nicolau syndrome)
- Livedoid vasculopathy (atrophie blanche, livedo reticularis with summer ulceration, livedoid vasculitis, PURPLE syndrome, segmental hyalinizing vasculitis)
- Lymphedema praecox
- Lymphedema–distichiasis syndrome
- Maffucci syndrome
- Majocchi's disease (purpura annularis telangiectodes, purpura annularis telangiectodes of Majocchi)
- Malignant atrophic papulosis (Degos' disease)
- Marshall–White syndrome
- Meige lymphedema
- Microscopic polyangiitis (microscopic polyarteritis, microscopic polyarteritis nodosa)
- Mondor's disease (Mondor's syndrome of superficial thrombophlebitis)
- Neuropathic ulcer (mal perforans)
- Njolstad syndrome
- Nonne–Milroy–Meige syndrome (hereditary lymphedema, Milroy disease)
- Obstructive purpura
- Orthostatic purpura (stasis purpura)
- Painful bruising syndrome (autoerythrocyte sensitization, Gardner–Diamond syndrome, psychogenic purpura)
- Parkes Weber syndrome
- Paroxysmal hand hematoma (Achenbach syndrome)
- Paroxysmal nocturnal hemoglobinuria
- Polyarteritis nodosa (panarteritis nodosa, periarteritis nodosa)
- Postcardiotomy syndrome
- Perinatal gangrene of the buttock
- Pigmentary purpuric eruptions (progressive pigmentary dermatosis, progressive pigmenting purpura, purpura pigmentosa chronica)
- Postinflammatory lymphedema
- Postmastectomy lymphangiosarcoma (Stewart–Treves syndrome)
- Purpura fulminans (purpura gangrenosa)
- Purpura secondary to clotting disorders
- Purpuric agave dermatitis
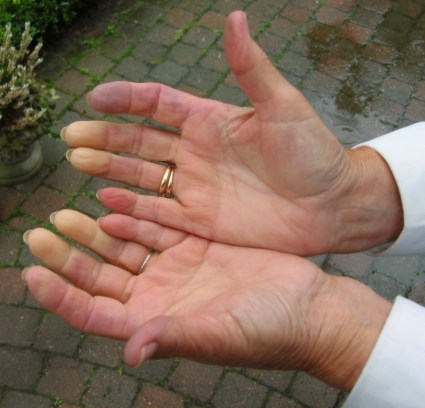
  Raynaud phenomenon
- Raynaud phenomenon
- Raynaud's disease (primary Raynaud's phenomenon)
- Reactive angioendotheliomatosis
- Schamberg's disease (progressive pigmentary dermatosis of Schamberg, purpura pigmentosa progressiva, Schamberg's purpura)
- Secondary lymphedema
- Septic thrombophlebitis
- Sinusoidal hemangioma
- Sneddon's syndrome (idiopathic livedo reticularis with cerebrovascular accidents)
- Solar purpura (actinic purpura, senile purpura)
- Stasis dermatitis (congestion eczema, gravitational dermatitis, gravitational eczema, stasis eczema, varicose eczema)
- Superficial thrombophlebitis
- Takayasu arteritis (aortic arch syndrome, pulseless disease)
- Temporal arteritis (cranial arteritis, Horton's disease)
- Thromboangiitis obliterans (Buerger's disease)
- Thrombotic thrombocytopenic purpura (Moschcowitz syndrome)
- Traumatic purpura
- Trousseau's syndrome
- Unilateral nevoid telangiectasia (nevoid telangiectasia)
- Urticarial vasculitis (chronic urticaria as a manifestation of venulitis, hypocomplementemic urticarial vasculitis syndrome, hypocomplementemic vasculitis, unusual lupus-like syndrome)
- Venous insufficiency ulceration
- Waldenström hyperglobulinemic purpura (purpura hyperglobulinemica)
- Waldenström macroglobulinemia
- Yellow nail syndrome (primary lymphedema associated with yellow nails and pleural effusion)

== See also ==
- Category:Cutaneous conditions
- Dermatology
- List of conditions associated with café au lait macules
- List of contact allergens
- List of cutaneous conditions associated with increased risk of nonmelanoma skin cancer
- List of cutaneous conditions associated with internal malignancy
- List of cutaneous conditions caused by mutations in keratins
- List of cutaneous neoplasms associated with systemic syndromes
- List of cutaneous conditions caused by problems with junctional proteins
- List of dental abnormalities associated with cutaneous conditions
- List of genes mutated in cutaneous conditions
- List of genes mutated in pigmented cutaneous lesions
- List of histologic stains that aid in diagnosis of cutaneous conditions
- List of human leukocyte antigen alleles associated with cutaneous conditions
- List of immunofluorescence findings for autoimmune bullous conditions
- List of inclusion bodies that aid in diagnosis of cutaneous conditions
- List of keratins expressed in the human integumentary system
- List of migrating cutaneous conditions
- List of mites associated with cutaneous reactions
- List of radiographic findings associated with cutaneous conditions
- List of specialized glands within the human integumentary system
- List of spiders associated with cutaneous reactions
- List of target antigens in pemphigoid
- List of target antigens in pemphigus
- List of verrucous carcinoma subtypes
- List of xanthoma variants associated with hyperlipoproteinemia subtypes
