= Acne fulminans =

- Specialty: Dermatology

Acne fulminans (also known as "acute febrile ulcerative acne") is a severe form of the skin disease, acne, which can occur after unsuccessful treatment for another form of acne, acne conglobata. The condition is thought to be an immunologically induced disease in which elevated level of testosterone causes a rise in sebum and population of Cutibacterium acnes bacteria. The increase in the amount of C acnes or related antigens may trigger the immunologic reaction in some individuals and lead to an occurrence of acne fulminans. In addition to testosterone, isotretinoin may also precipitate acne fulminans, possibly related to highly increased levels of C acnes antigens in the patient's immune system. Acne fulminans is a rare disease. Over the past several years, fewer cases of this disease have occurred, possibly because of earlier and better treatment of acne. Approximately 100 patients with acne fulminans have been described.

== Signs and symptoms ==
Acne fulminans begins as pain and inflammation in the joints. It eventually progresses into a swelling of the lymph nodes located at the base of the neck, causing inflexibility in the neck within weeks after the nodes swell. This swelling will eventually decrease, but this decrease will be accompanied by an increased inflammation and swelling of the joints, as well as a complete loss of appetite, though these symptoms are often ignored. After some time, the disease will cause an extreme loss of weight and atrophy of the muscles, leading to the decline of physical abilities.

== Outcome and treatment ==
There is limited evidenced-based data concerning the treatment of AF. Treatment should be sought immediately in order to avoid hospitalization. If not treated, hospitalization for an extended period of time (usually two weeks) is likely. During hospitalization, the patient is tested for signs of system degradation, especially of the skeletal structure and the digestive tract. By this time open sores will develop on the upper torso. Some will be the size of dimes, others will be large enough to stick a couple fingers into. They will crust up, causing cohesion to any fabric the sores touch, which is extremely painful to remove. It is recommended to sleep on one's sides until the cystic condition subsides, in order to avoid any uncomfortable situations. Debridement and immunosuppressant drugs (e.g. prednisone) are preferred over antibiotics. Recurrent AF is extremely rare. Bone lesions typically resolve with treatment, but residual radiographic changes, such as sclerosis and hyperostosis, may remain. Scarring and fibrosis may result from this acute inflammatory process. The disease activates at the height of puberty, usually at around 13 years of age. Acne fulminans predominantly affects young Hispanic White males aged 13 to 22 years with a history of acne. Studies have found successful treatment with Antimicrobial Agents and Oral Prednisolone.

== History ==
In 1958, at a meeting of the Detroit Dermatological Society, Burns and Colville presented a 16-year-old white boy with acute febrile disease and acne conglobata. Many similar cases have been reported since then. Genetic factors may play an important role in some patients; 4 sets of identical twins who developed an identical pattern of acne fulminans have been documented.

== See also ==
- List of cutaneous conditions
