= Dissecting cellulitis of the scalp =

- Other names: Dissecting folliculitis, perifolliculitis capitis abscedens et suffodiens of Hoffman, perifolliculitis abscedens et suffodiens, or folliculitis abscedens et suffodiens
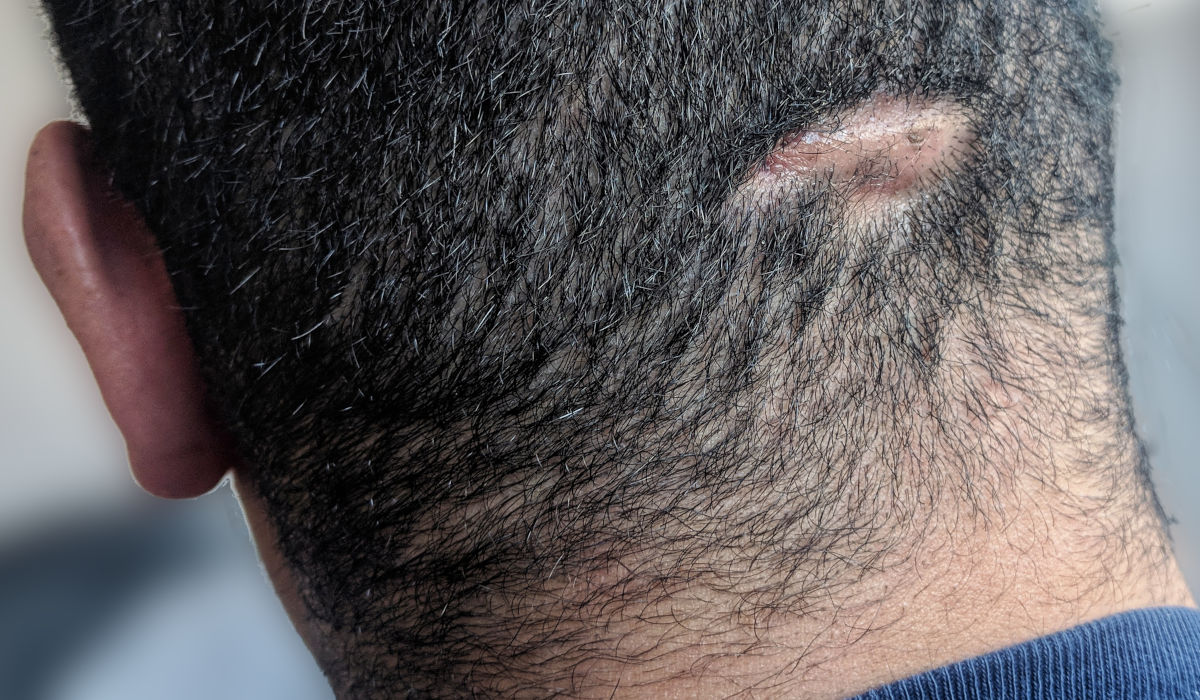
- Boggy, suppurative nodule with patchy hair loss typical of dissecting cellulitis of the scalp
- Specialty: Dermatology
- Medication: Isotretinoin

Dissecting cellulitis of the scalp, also known as dissecting folliculitis, perifolliculitis capitis abscedens et suffodiens of Hoffman, perifolliculitis abscedens et suffodiens, or folliculitis abscedens et suffodiens, is an inflammatory condition of the scalp that can lead to scarring alopecia, which begins with deep inflammatory nodules, primarily over occiput, that progresses to coalescing regions of boggy scalp. Boggy tissue has a high fluid level that results in a spongy feeling. Isotretinoin proves to be the medicine of choice for the treatment of the disease.

== Demographics ==
Dissecting cellulitis of the scalp predominantly affects adult men of African descent, typically between the ages of 20 and 40. It has been documented globally and can occasionally occur in women, children, and individuals of other racial backgrounds. There are rare instances of it running in families.

== Symptoms ==
The condition generally originates on the top (vertex) or back (occiput) of the head, initially presenting as simple inflamed hair follicles, developing into a network of deeper lesions, including pus-filled bumps, interconnected abscesses, and sinus tracts that can leak fluid. Because the condition is long-lasting and prone to relapsing, the persistent inflammation ultimately leads to permanent, scarring hair loss (alopecia) and the formation of thick, keloid scars across the scalp.

== Causes and associated conditions ==
The underlying mechanism may be driven by the blockage of hair follicles. When a blocked follicle swells and bursts, it releases trapped keratin and bacteria into the surrounding tissue. This triggers a severe immune and inflammatory response, which is often followed by a secondary bacterial infection.

Dissecting cellulitis is frequently linked to a group of related inflammatory conditions known as the follicular occlusion triad (or tetrad). This means patients may simultaneously have hidradenitis suppurativa, severe cystic acne (acne conglobata), and pilonidal cysts.

== Treatment ==
Managing the condition is challenging. Medical approaches often rely on systemic medications such as oral antibiotics, corticosteroids (like prednisone), and isotretinoin. For more severe or treatment-resistant cases, destructive or surgical interventions may be necessary. These can include surgical removal of the affected tissue, skin grafts, or radiation therapy.

== See also ==
- List of cutaneous conditions
