= Keloid =

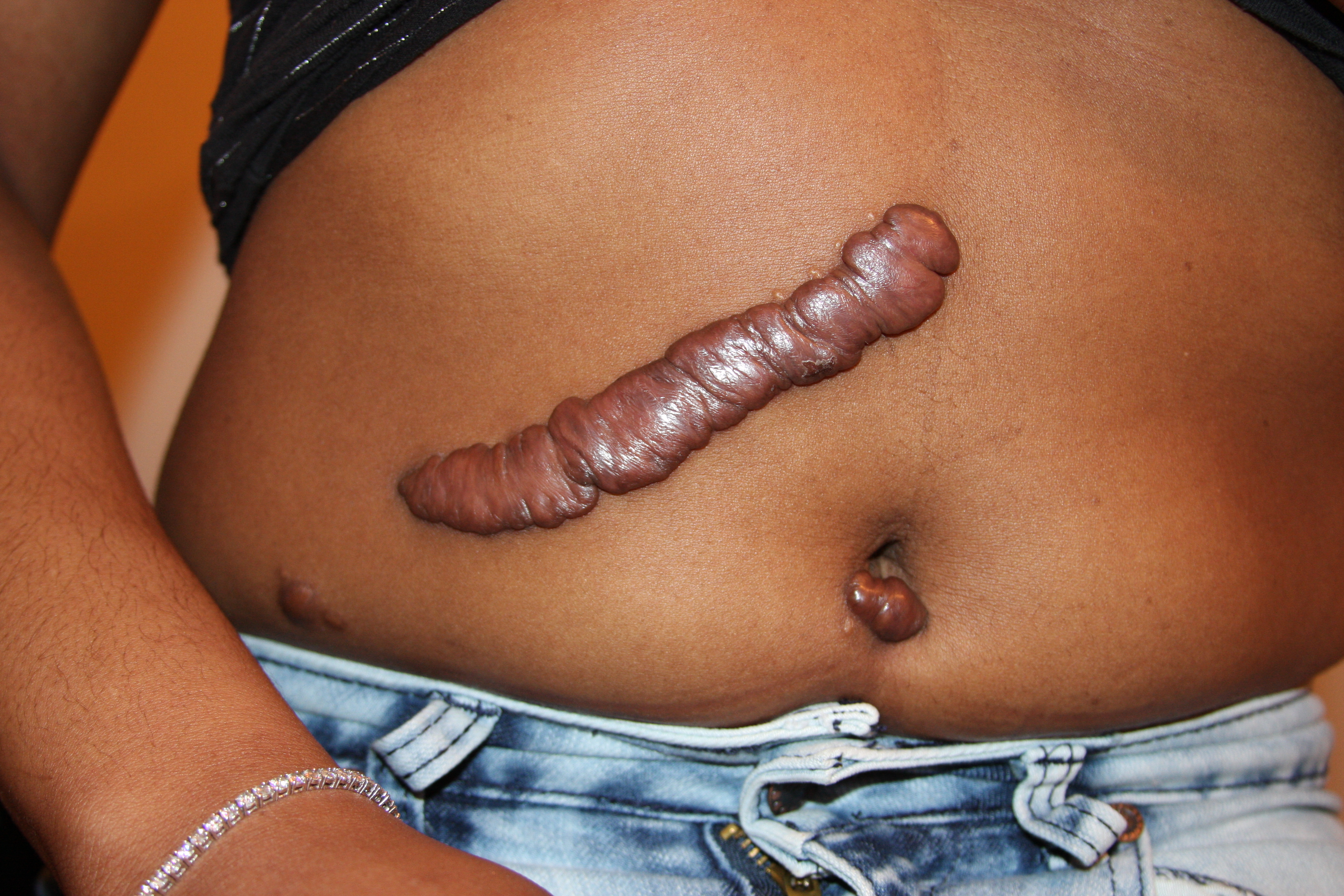
- Bulky keloid forming at the site of abdominal surgery
- Pronunciation: /ˈkiːlɔɪd/
- Specialty: Dermatology
- Usual onset: scar formation
- Risk factors: Sub-Saharan African, Asian or Latin American ancestry

Keloids, the formation of which is known as keloidosis and keloidal scarring, are a type of scar. Depending on its maturity, a keloid is composed mainly of either type III (early) or type I (late) collagen. It is a result of an overgrowth of granulation tissue (collagen type III) at the site of a healed skin injury, which is then slowly replaced by collagen type I. Keloids are firm, rubbery lesions or shiny, fibrous nodules, and can vary from pink to the color of the person's skin or red to dark brown. A keloid scar is benign and not contagious, but sometimes accompanied by severe itchiness, pain, and changes in texture. In severe cases, it can affect the movement of the skin. In the United States, keloid scars are seen 15 times more frequently in people of sub-Saharan African descent than in people of European descent. There is a higher tendency to develop a keloid among those with a family history of keloids and people between the ages of 10 and 30 years.

Keloids should not be confused with hypertrophic scars, which are raised scars that do not grow beyond the boundaries of the original wound.

== Signs and symptoms ==
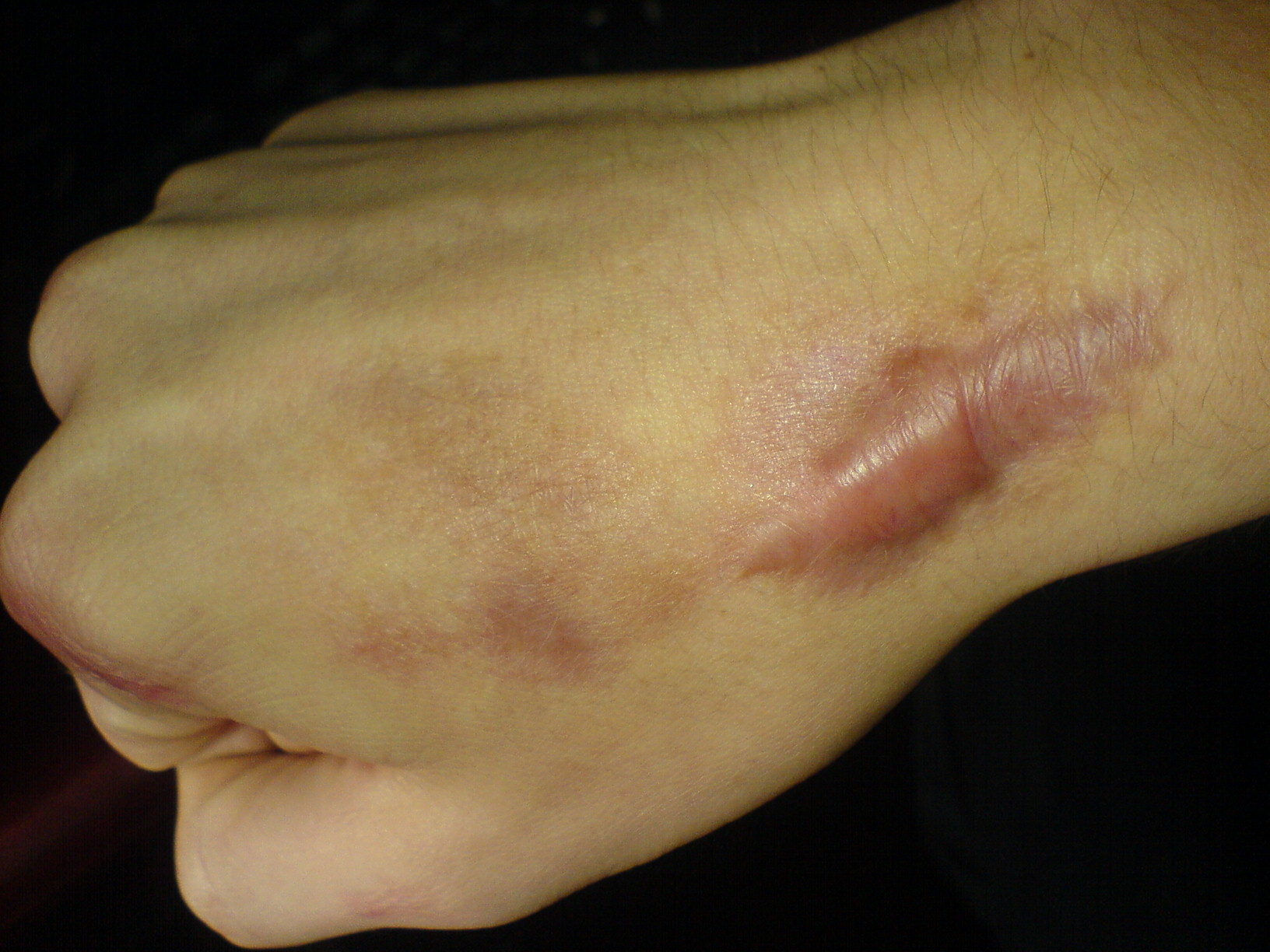
Postoperative keloid on the wrist

Keloids expand in claw-like growths over normal skin. They can hurt with a needle-like pain or to itch, the degree of sensation varying from person to person.

Keloids typically form within scar tissue. Collagen, used in wound repair, tends to overgrow in this area, sometimes producing a lump many times larger than that of the original scar. They can also range in color from pink to red. Although they usually occur at the site of an injury, keloids can also arise spontaneously. They can occur at the site of a piercing and even from something as simple as a pimple or scratch. They can occur as a result of severe acne or chickenpox scarring, infection at a wound site, repeated trauma to an area, excessive skin tension during wound closure or a foreign body in a wound. Keloids can sometimes be sensitive to chlorine. If a keloid appears when someone is still growing, the keloid can continue to grow as well.

Images
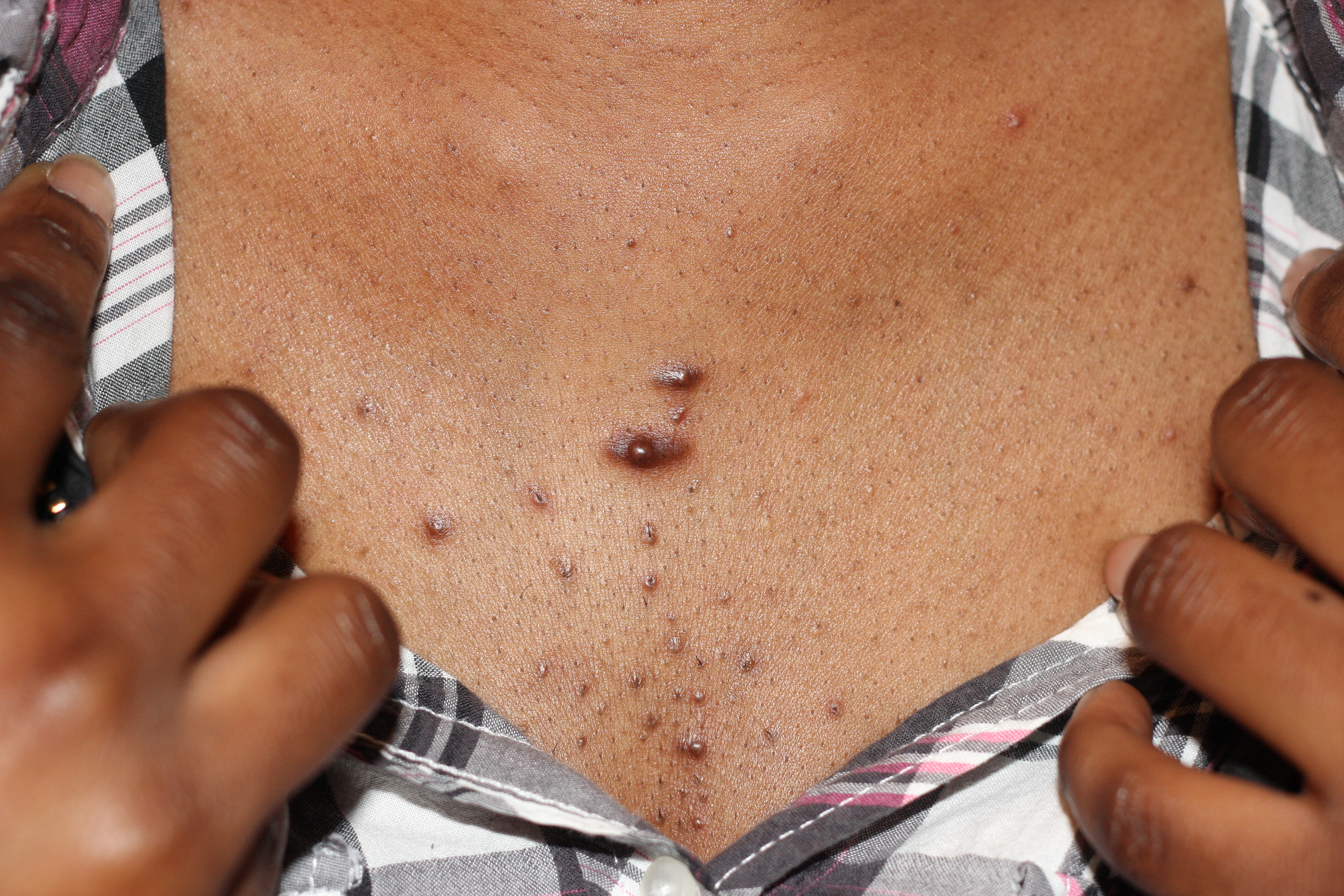
Small size keloid papules

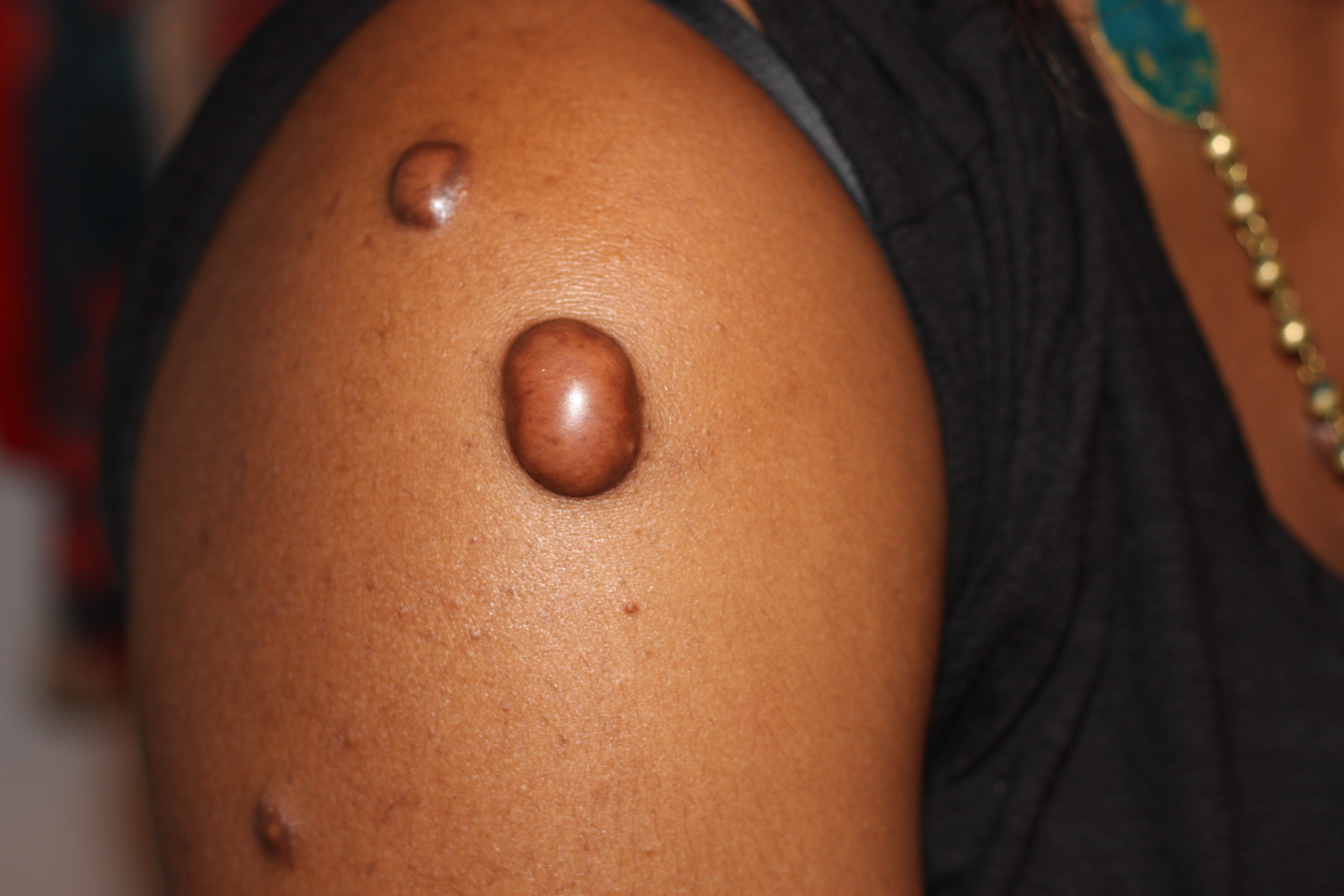
Keloid nodules (1–2 cm in diameter) and a keloid tumor >2 cm in diameter

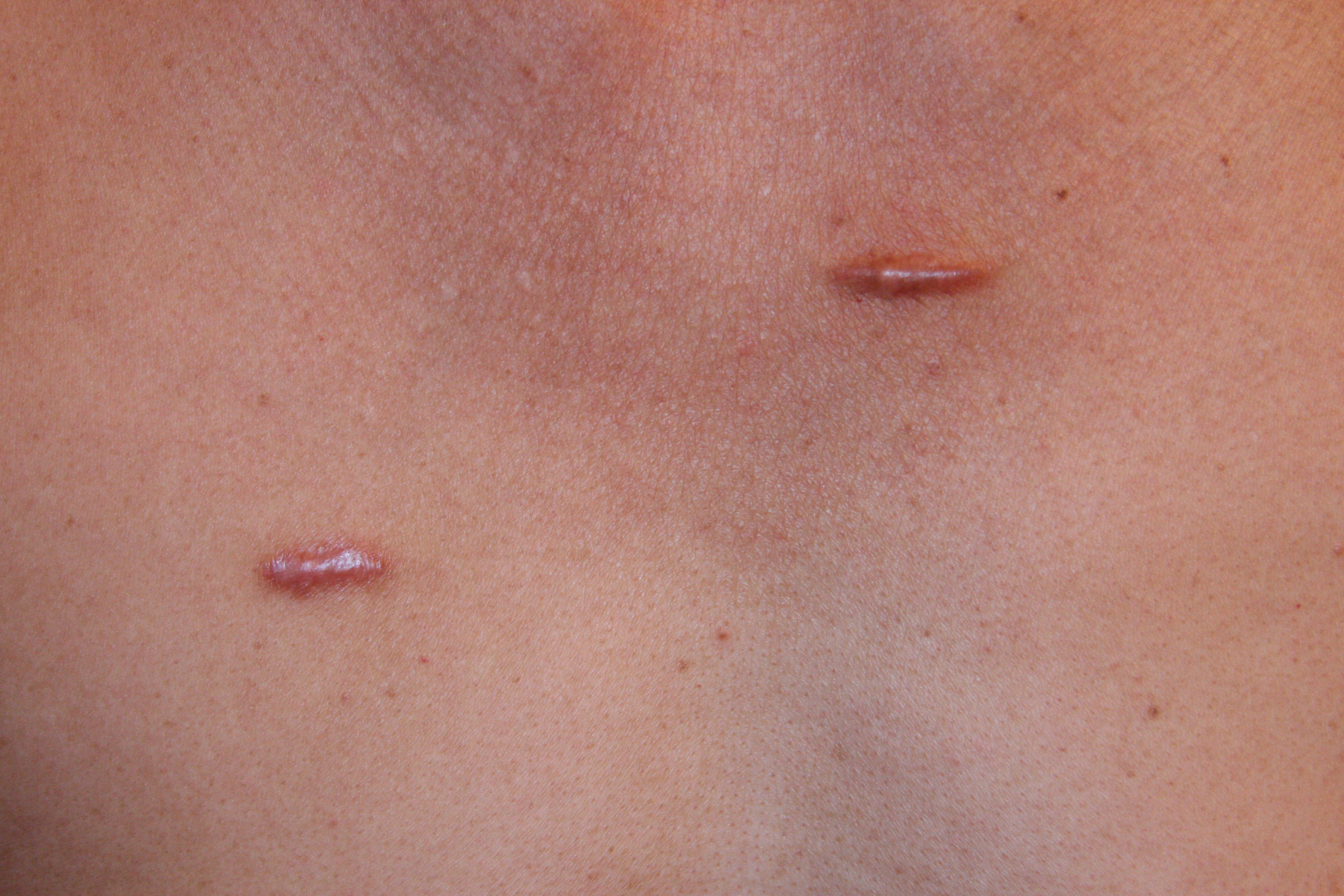
Two linear keloids

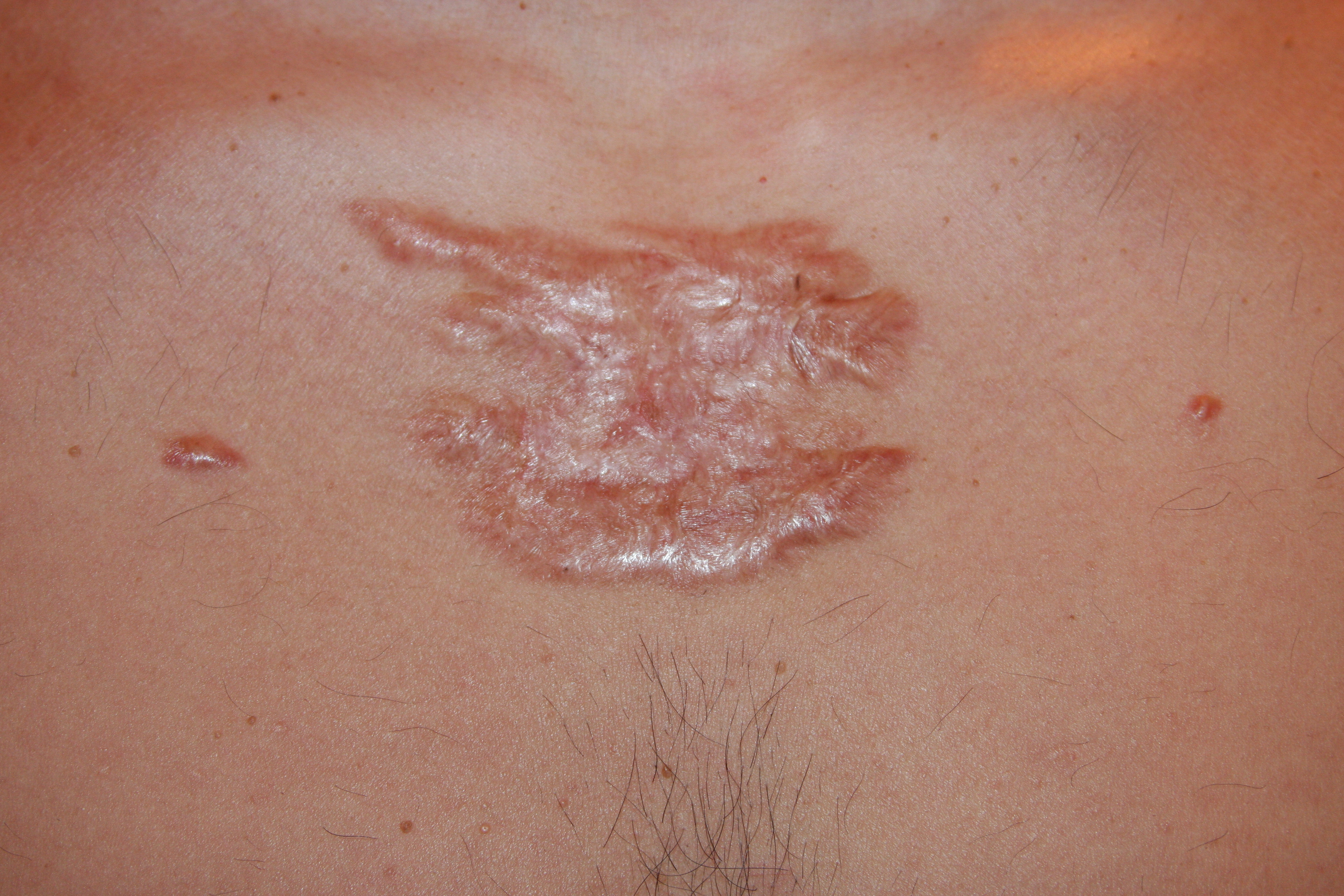
Patch of flat keloid

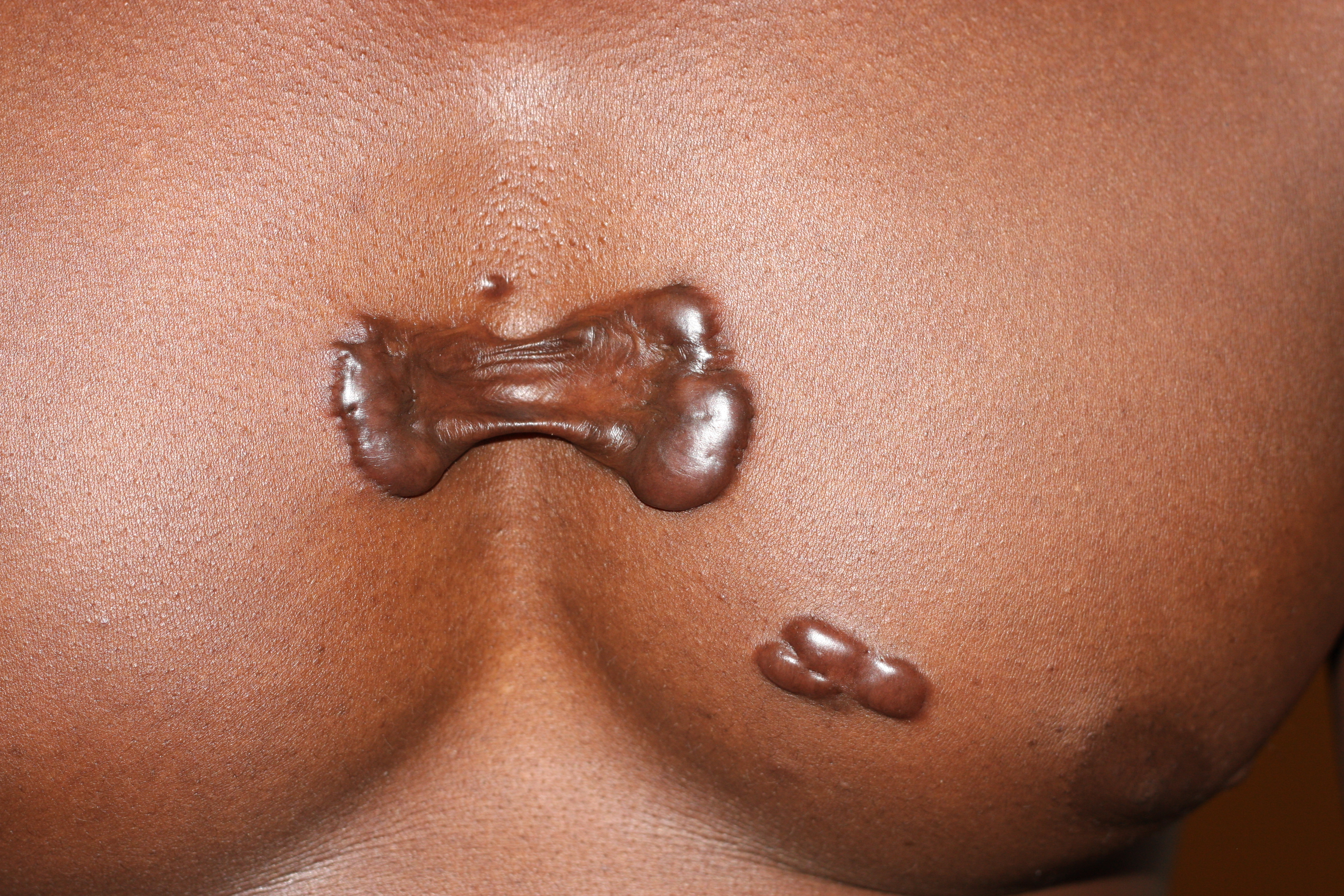
Butterfly type keloid

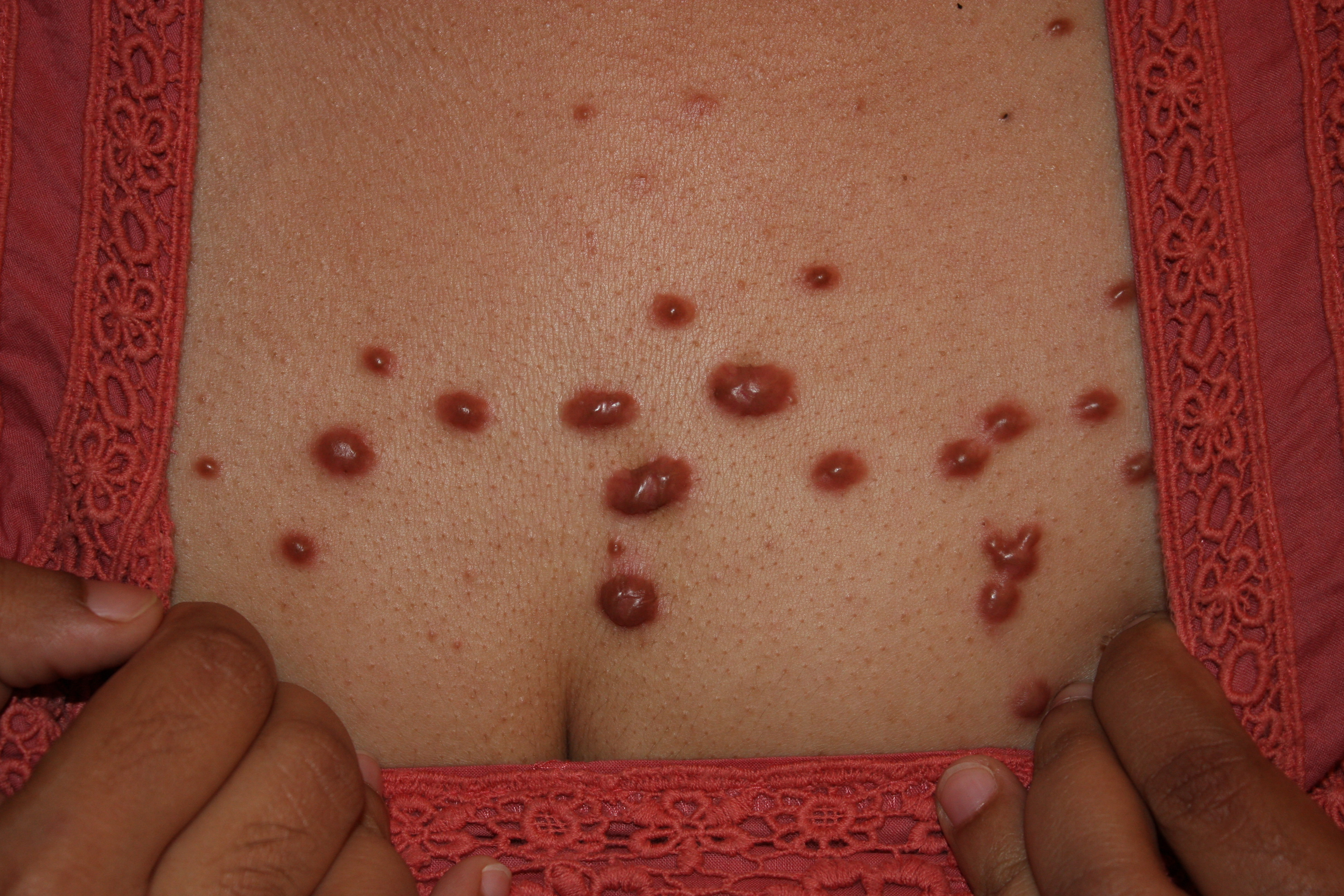
Guttate keloid

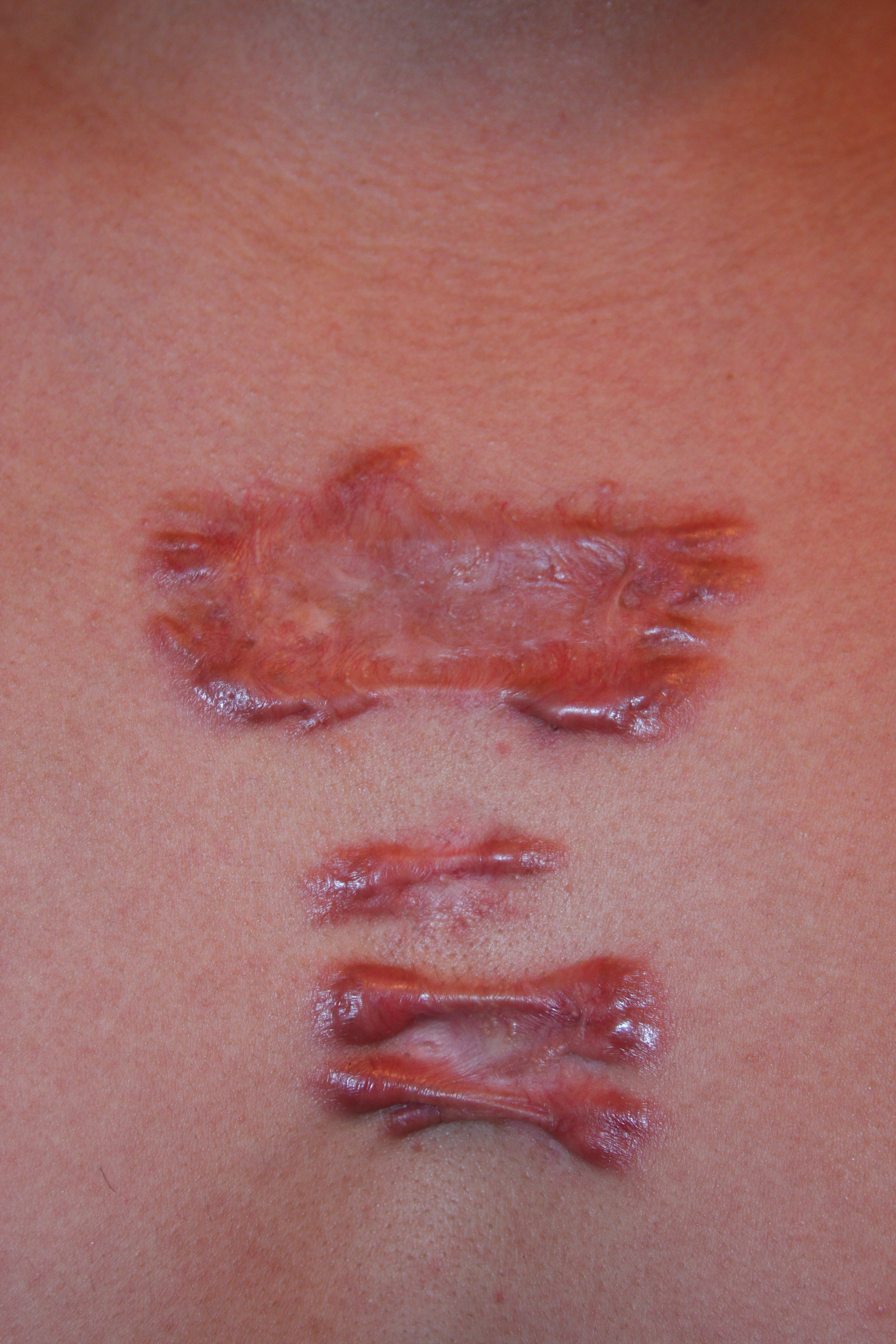
Hyper-inflammatory keloid of the chest wall

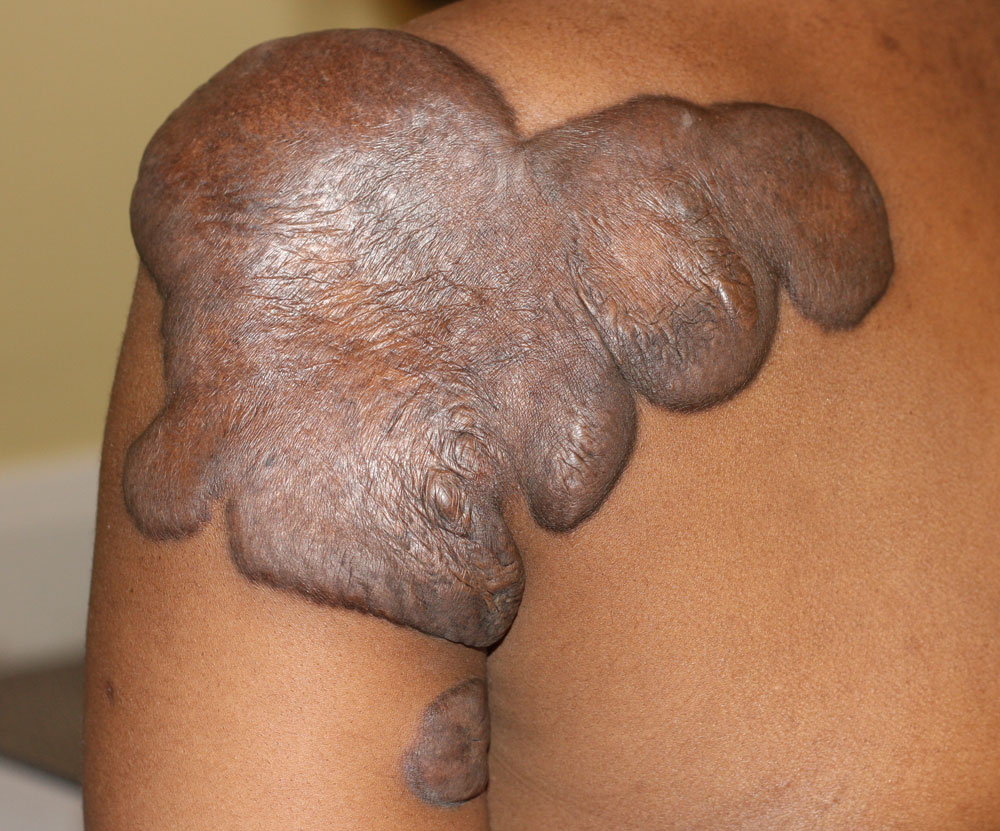
Superficially spreading keloid

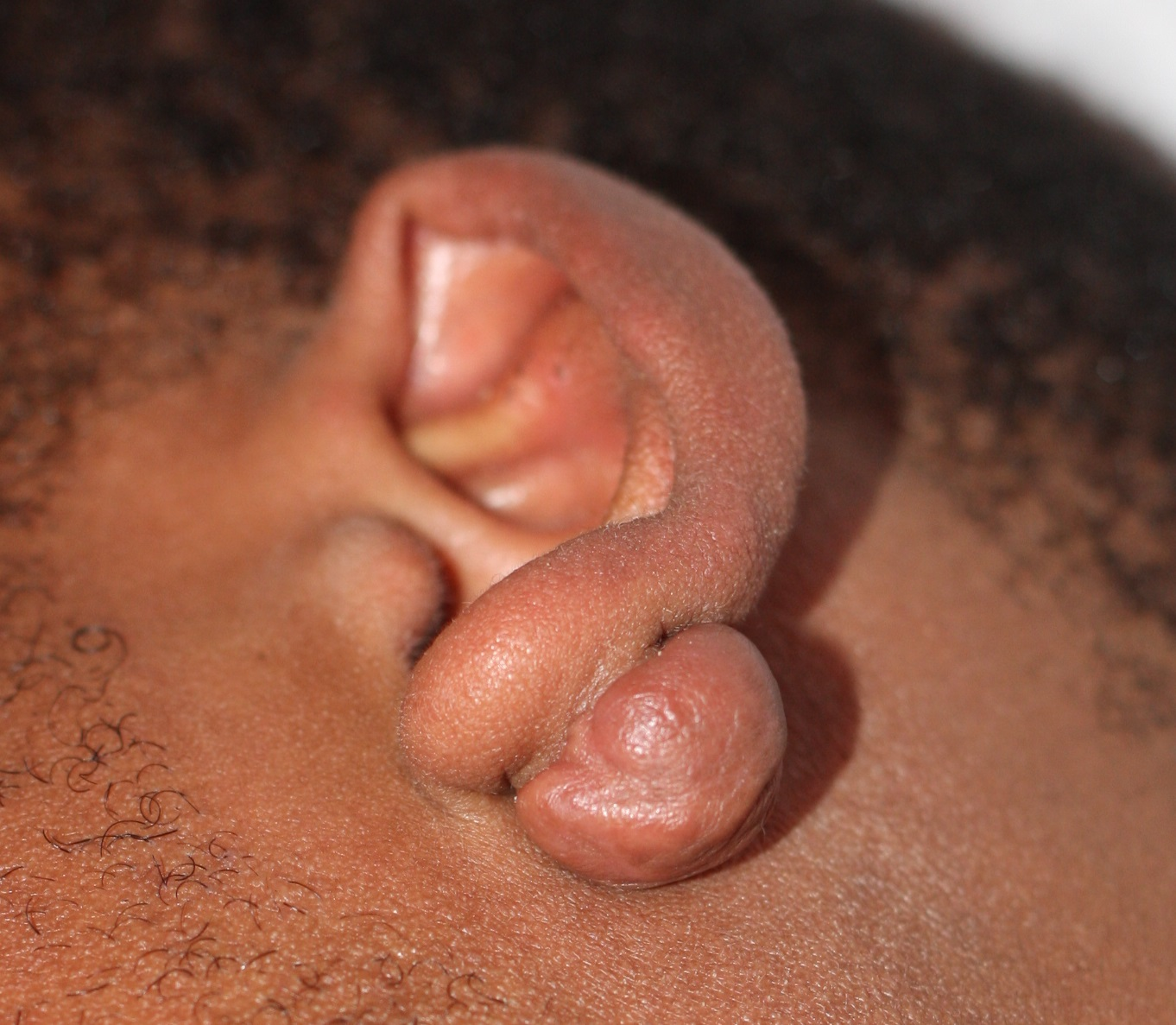
Pedunculated keloid that grows with a stalk, much like a mushroom

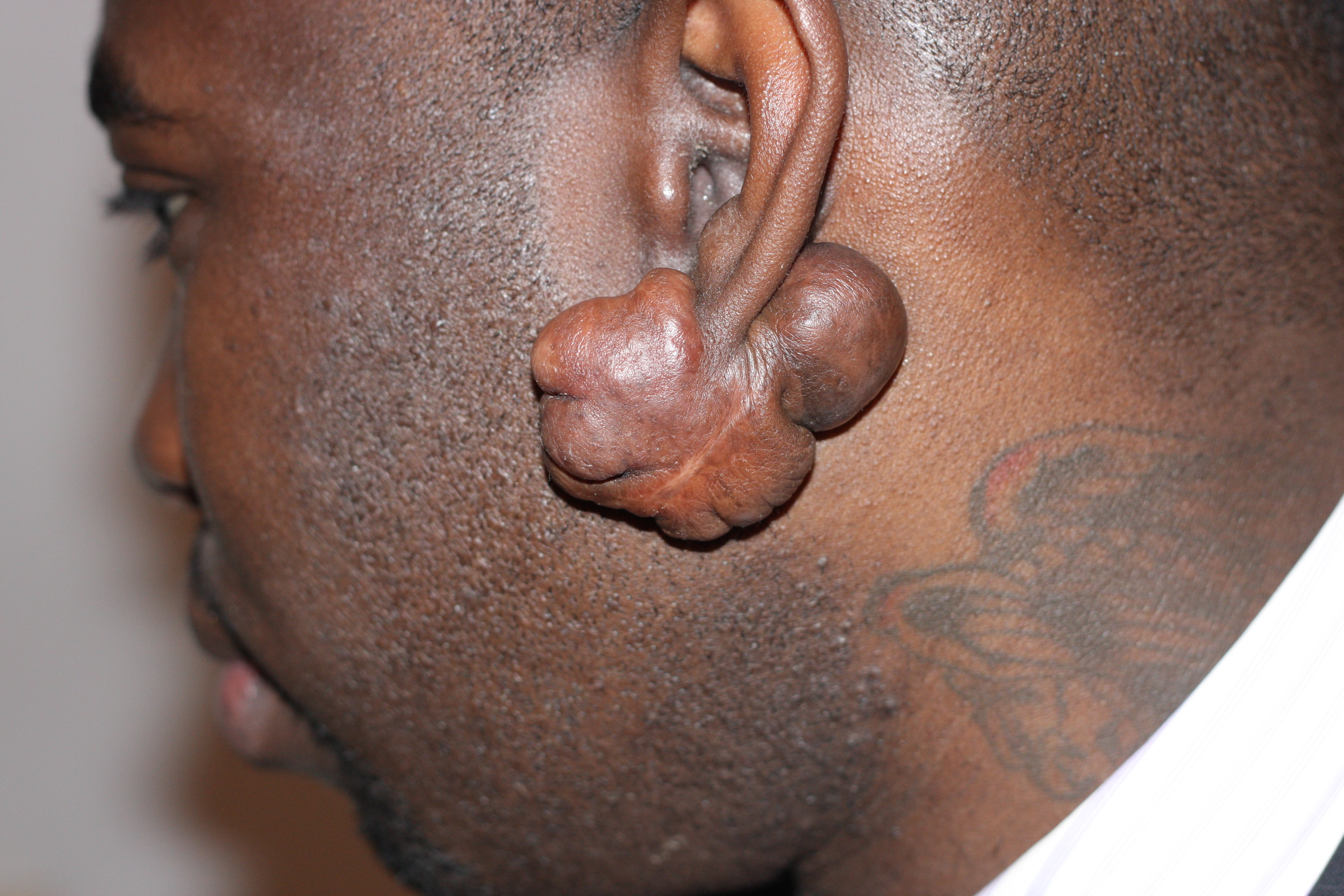
Bulky keloid

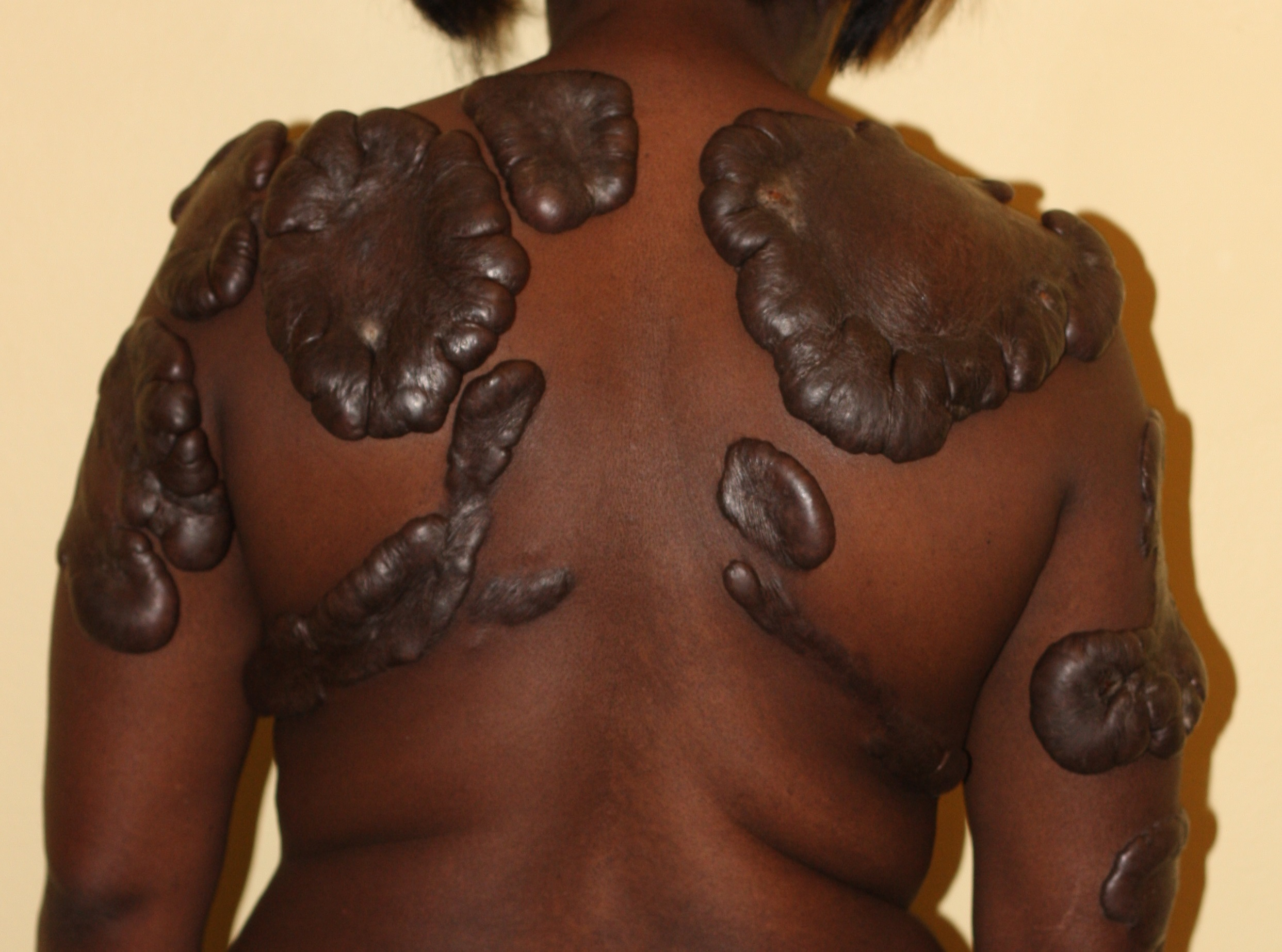
Large keloids

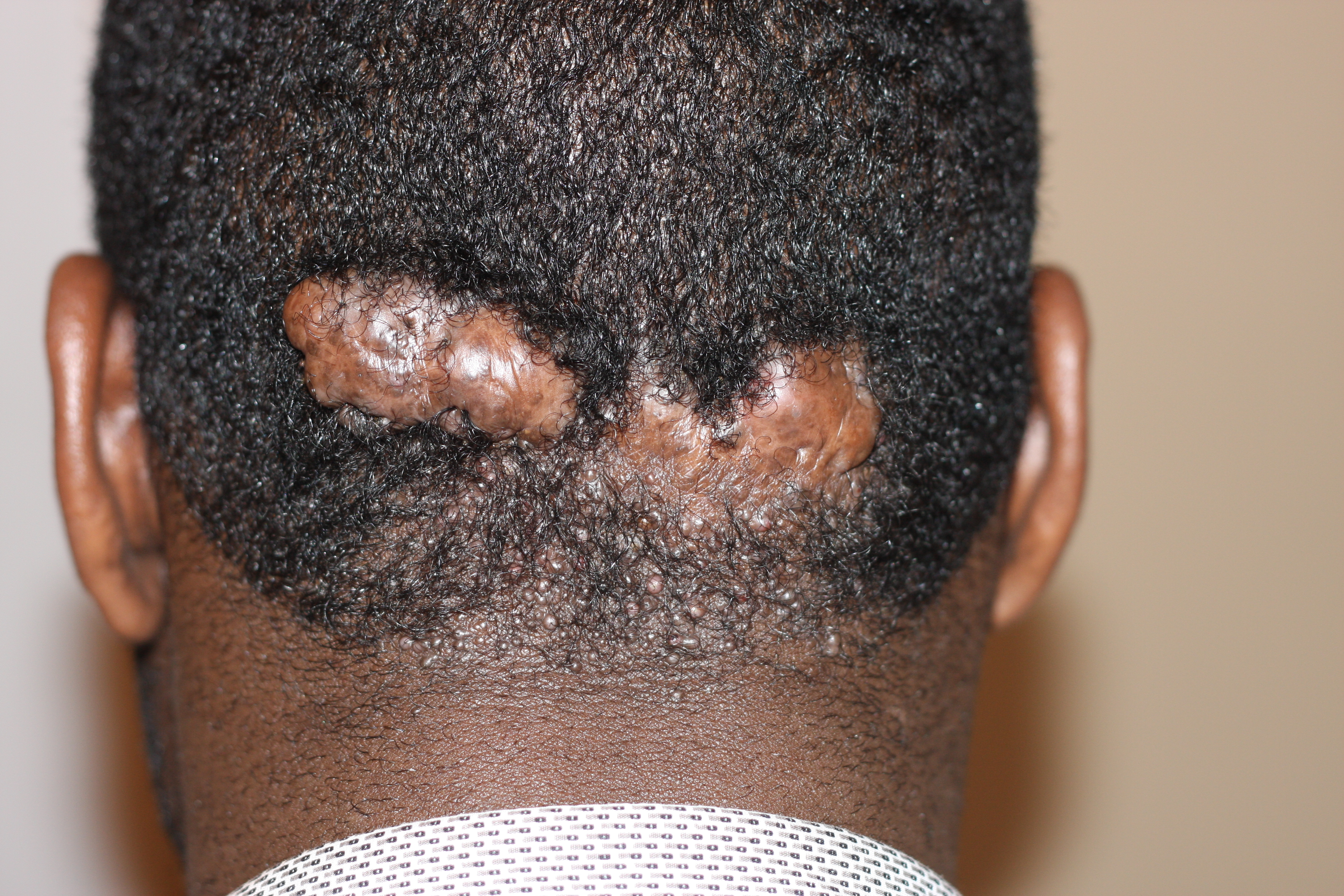
Scalp keloids in occipital area (dissecting cellulitis)

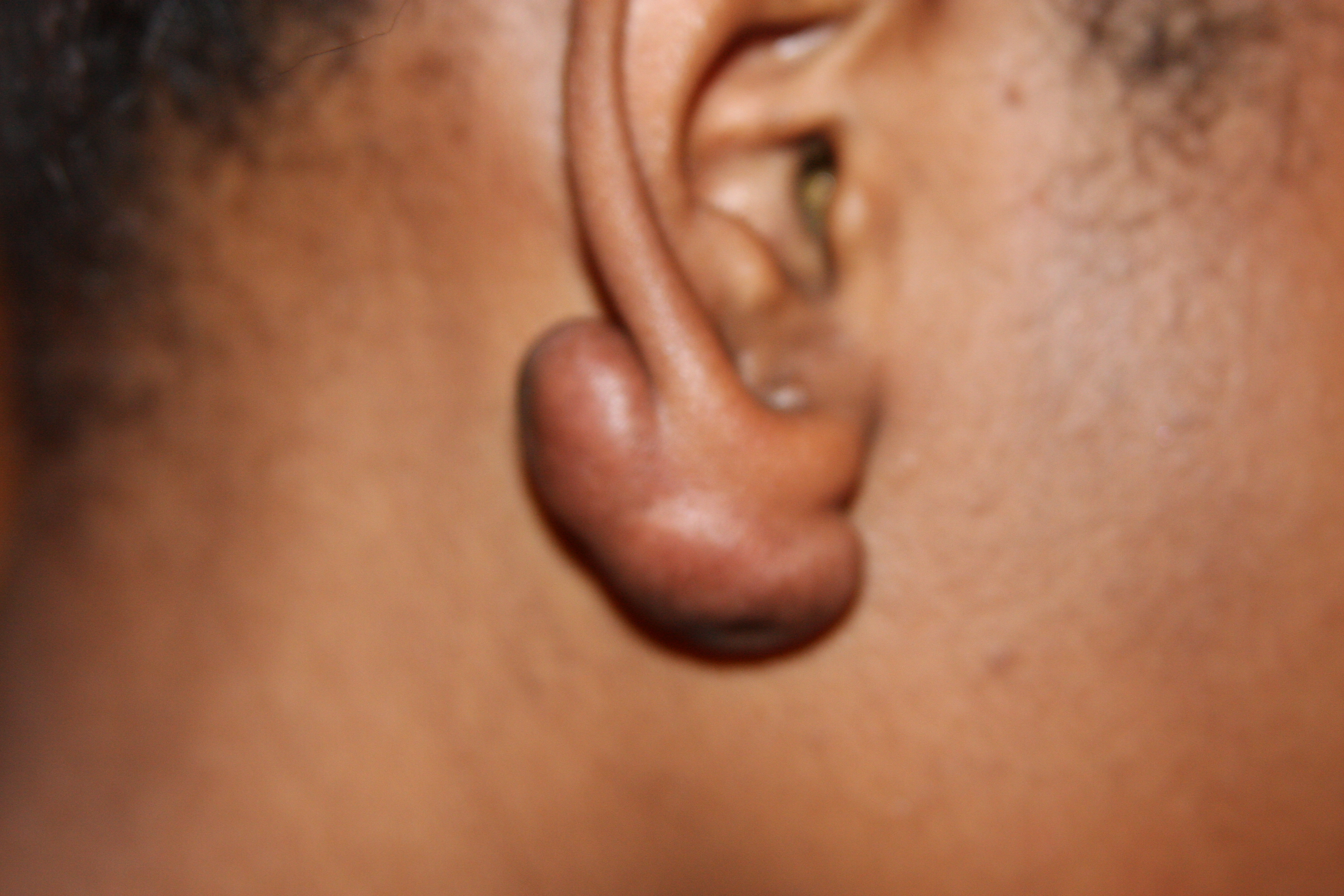
Earlobe keloid

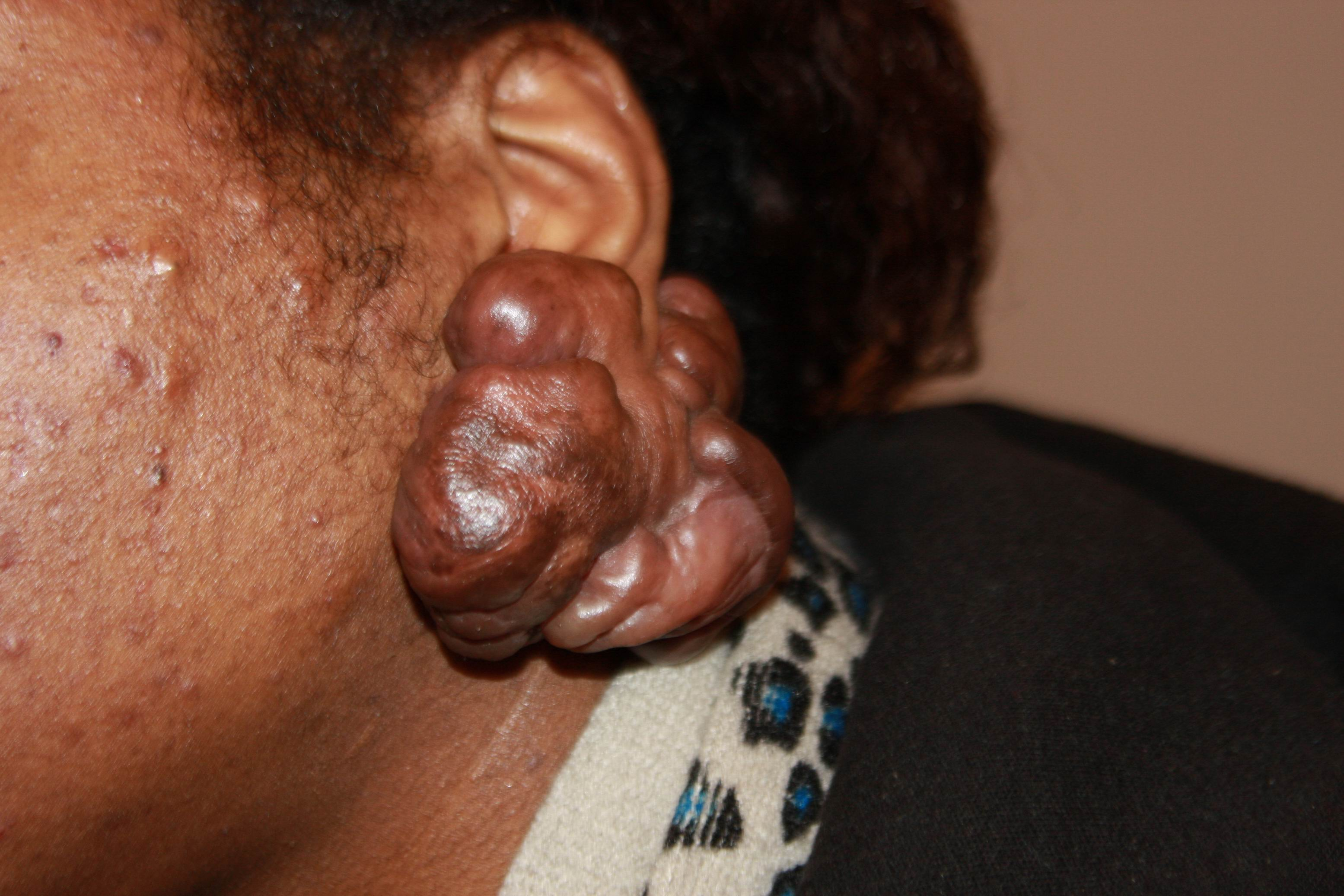
Large earlobe keloid forming after repeated surgeries

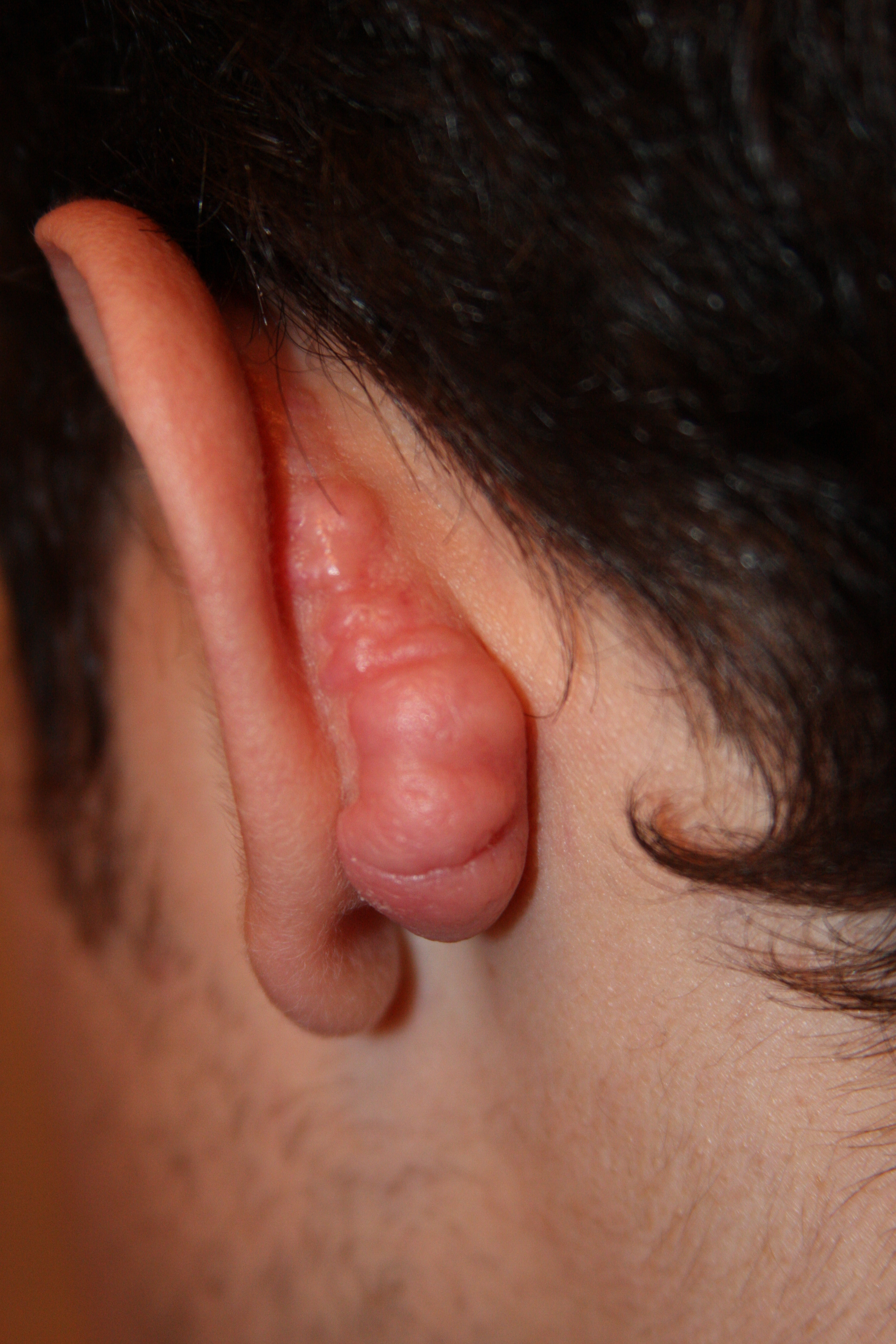
Posterior auricular keloid triggered by otoplasty surgery

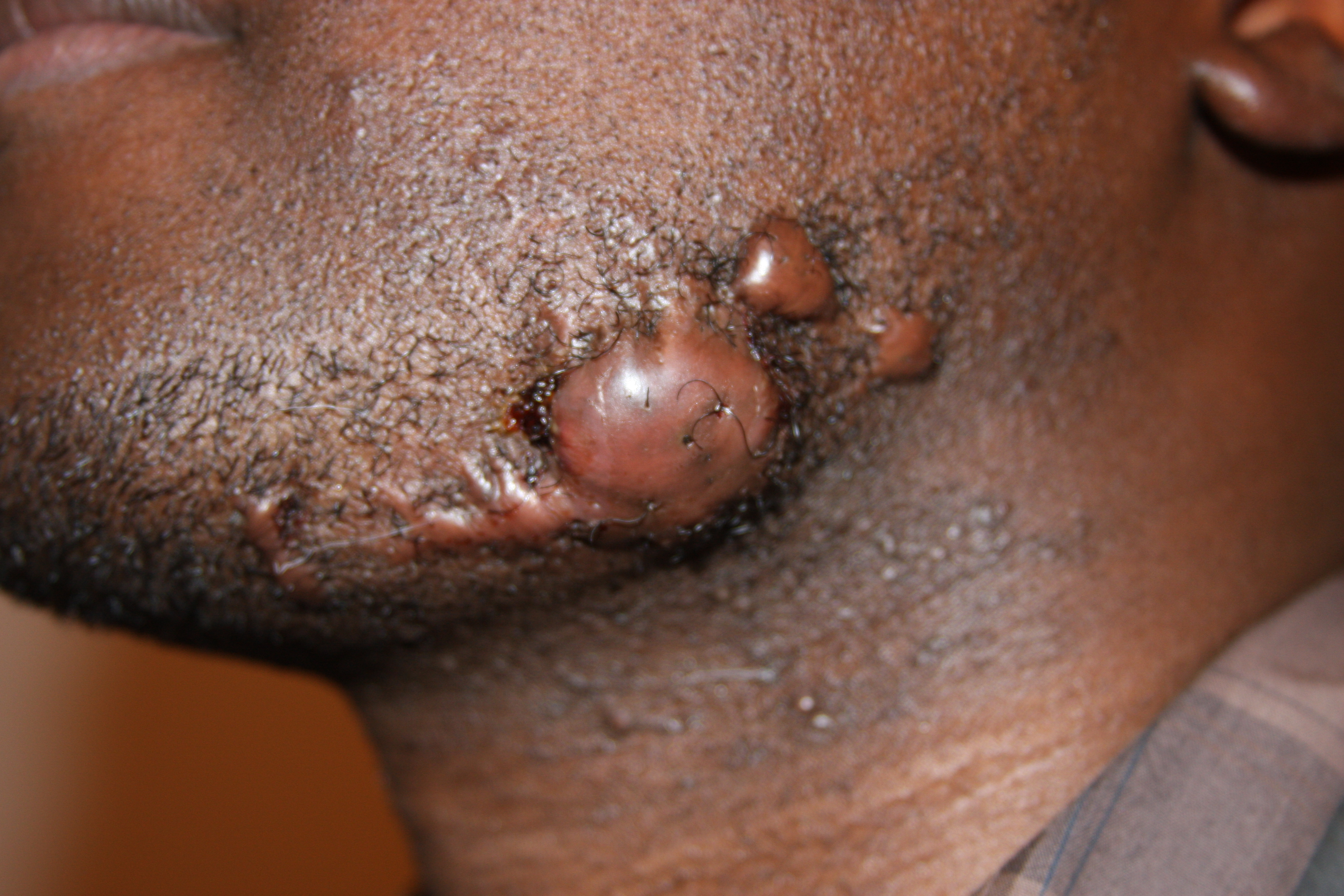
Facial nodular keloids in African American male

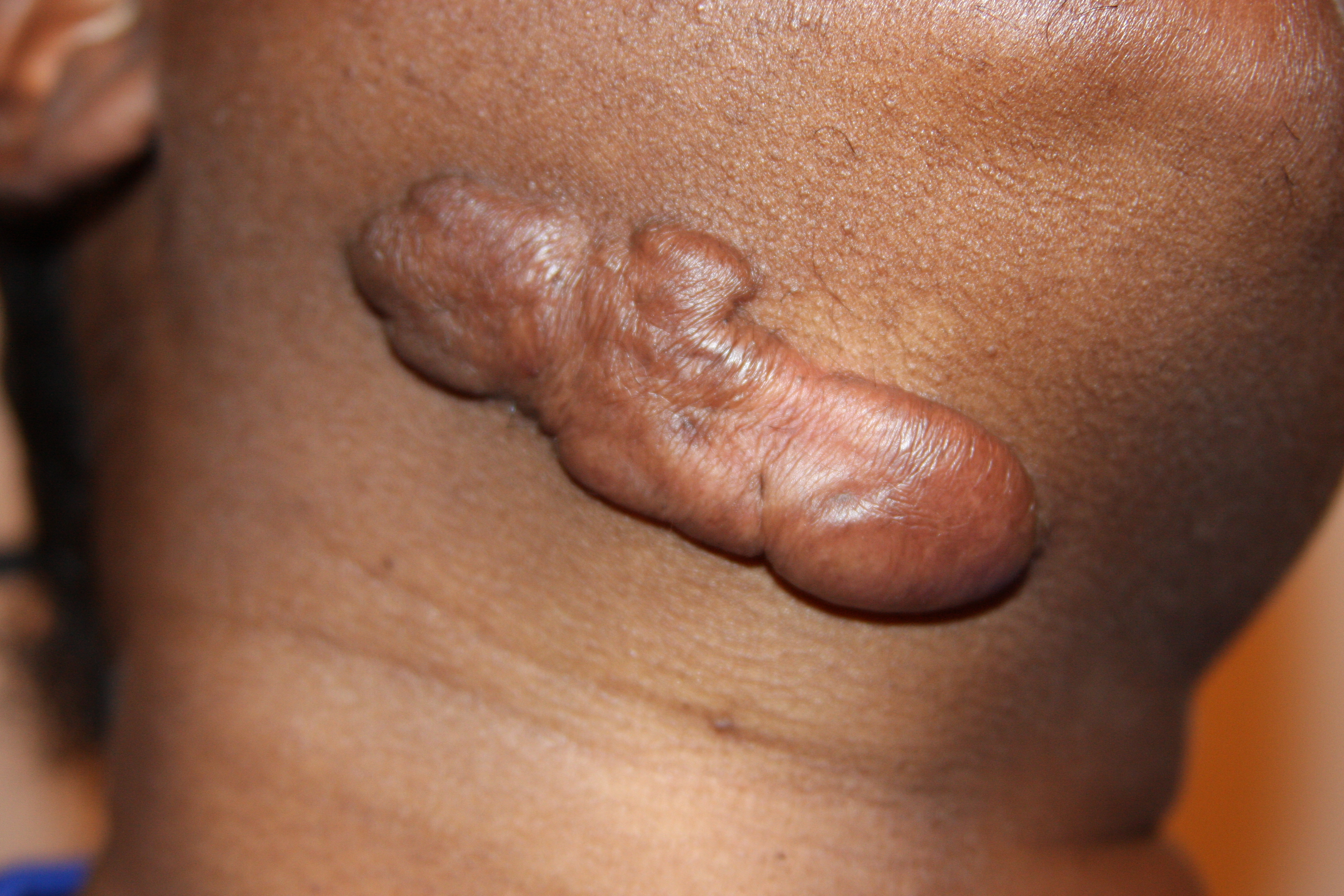
Bulky keloid of the neck

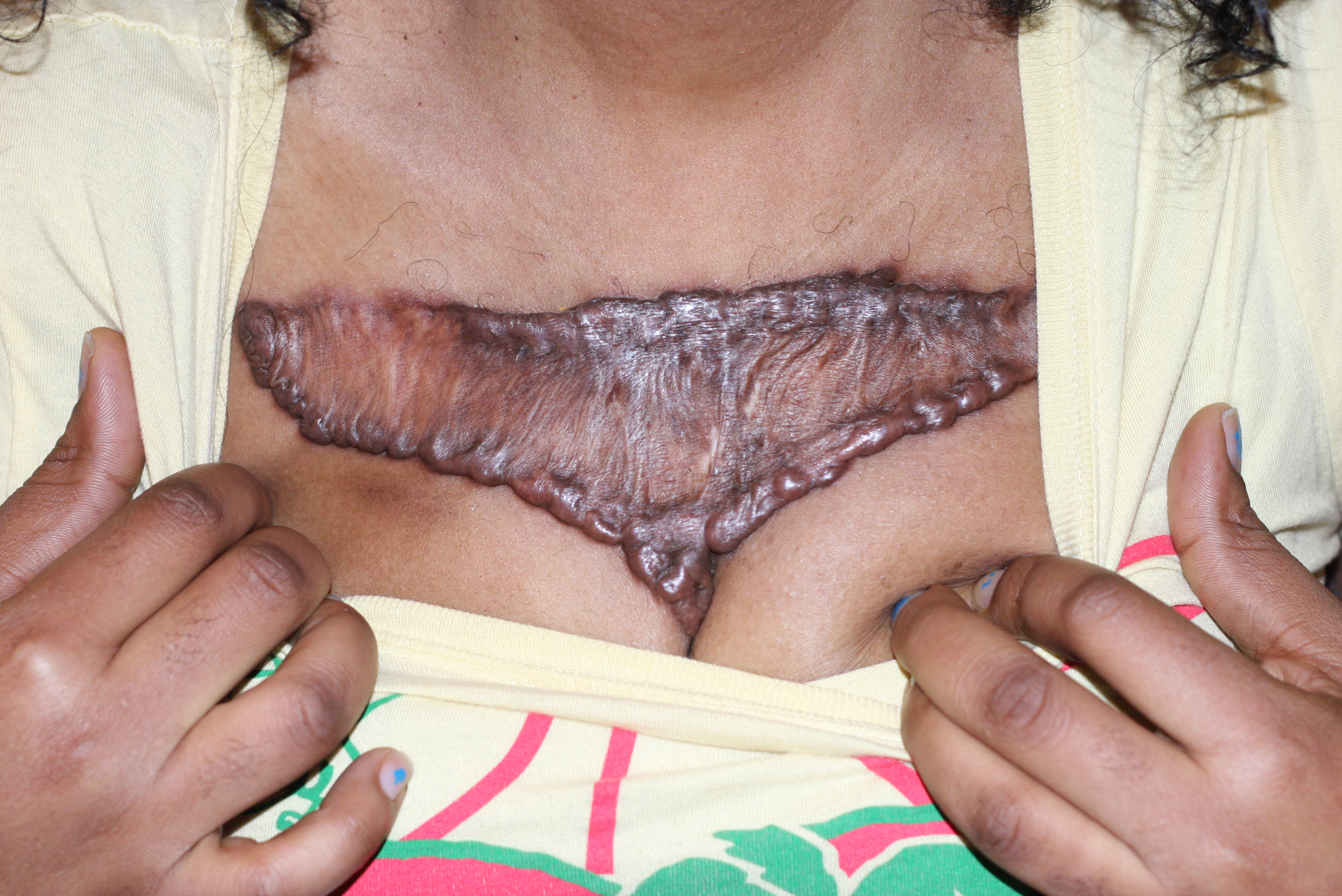
Inflammatory keloid of the chest wall, worsened with surgery

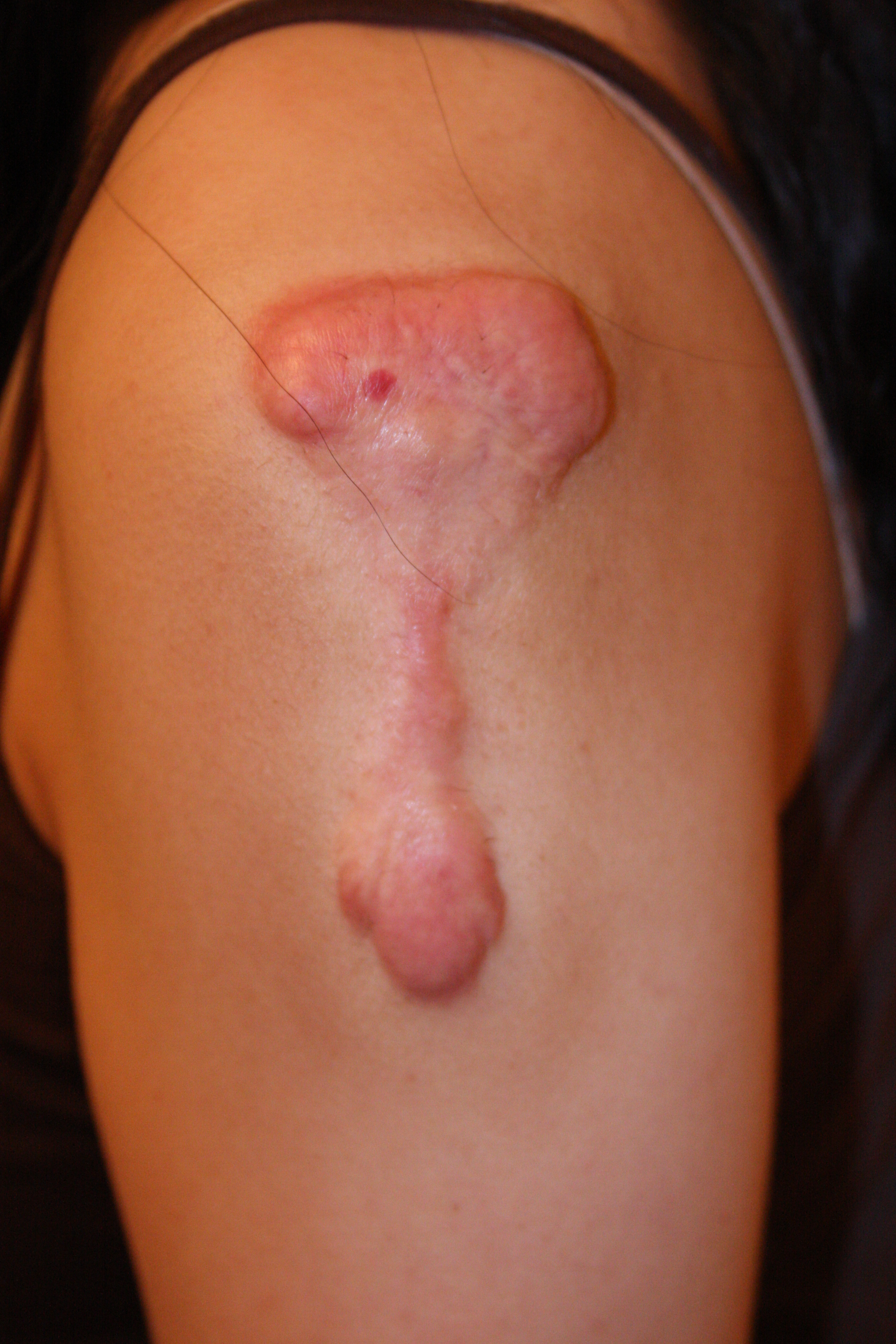
Flat, superficially spreading keloid in the upper arm area

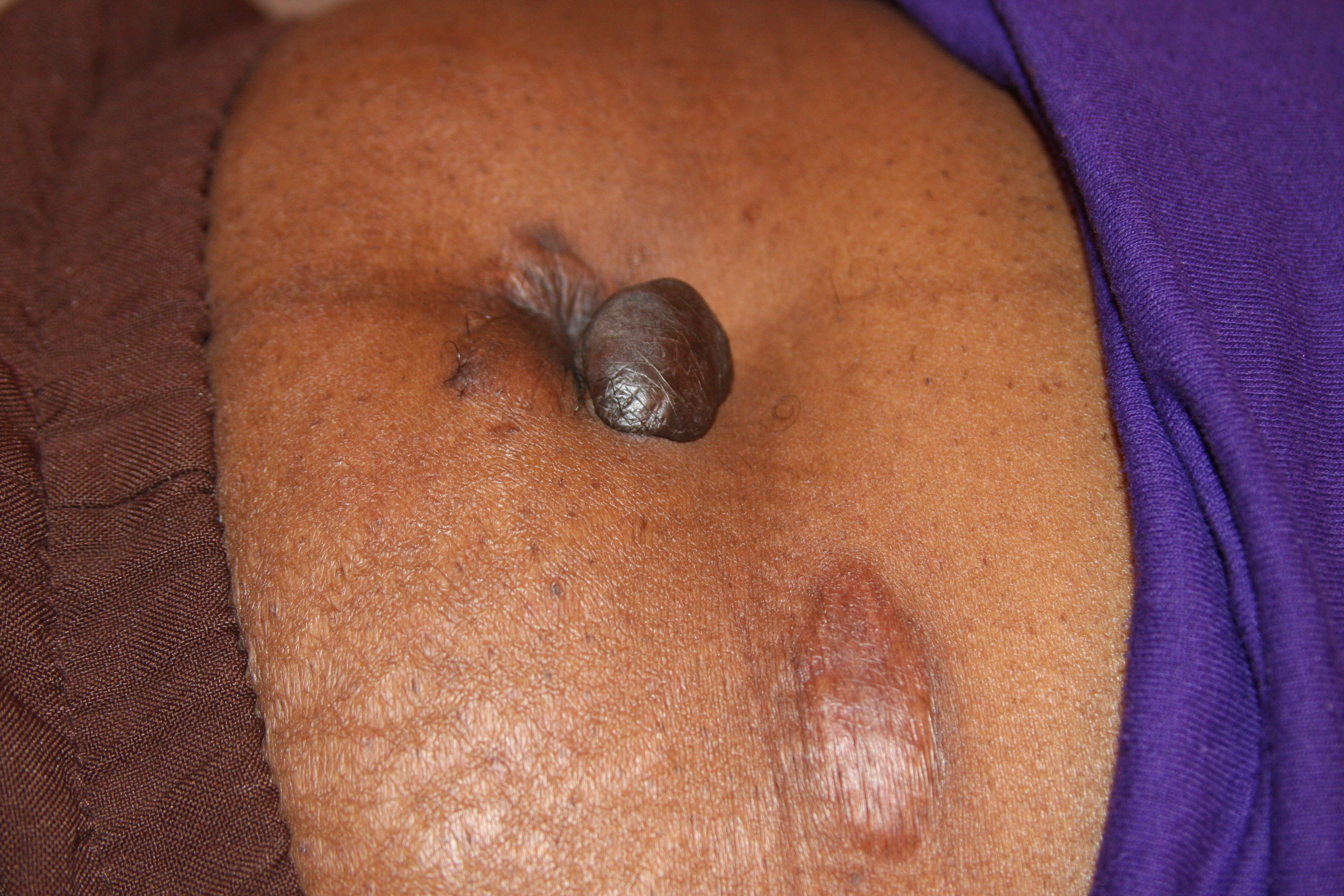
Pedunculated umblical keloid

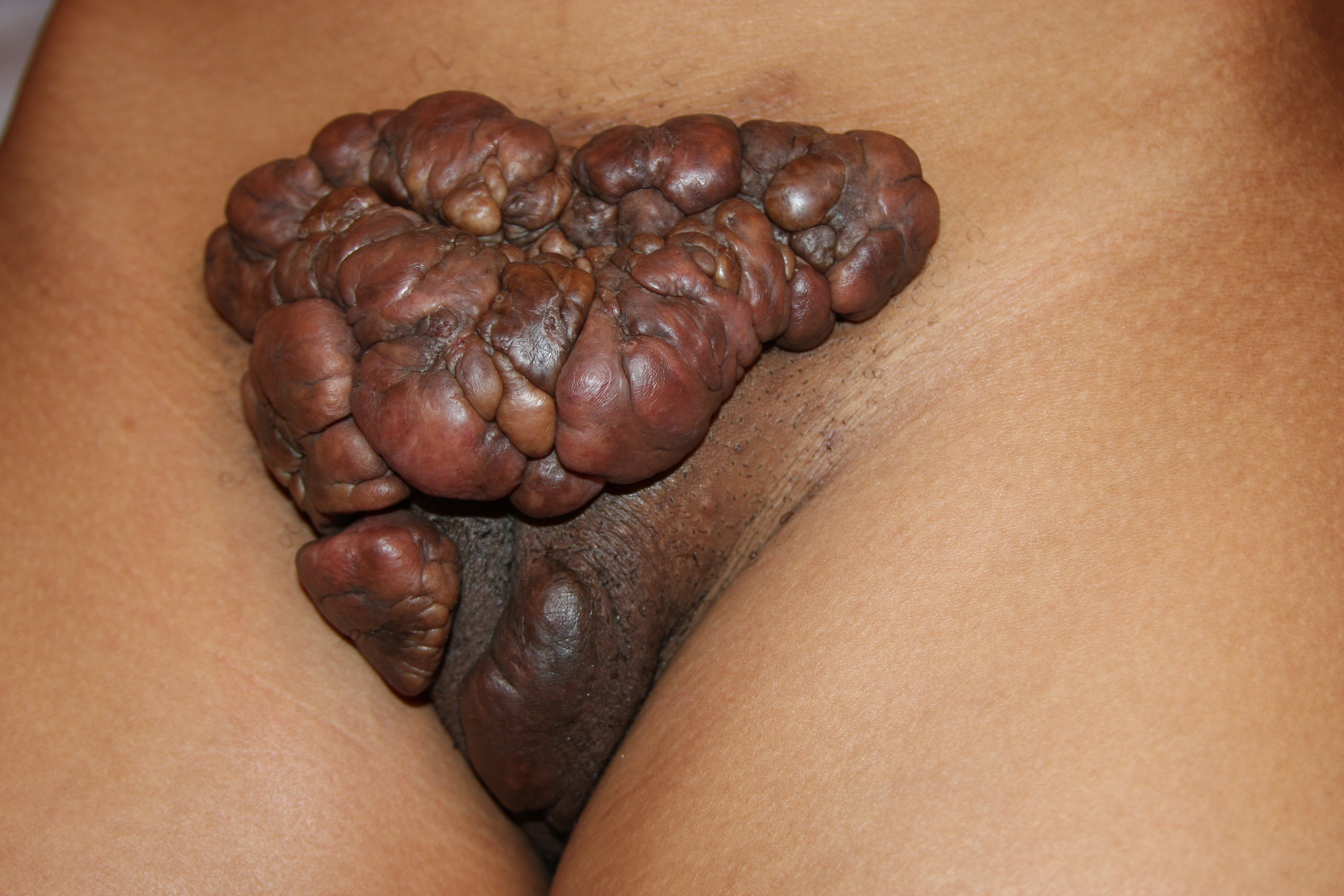
Multi-nodular conglomerate of the pubic area, worsened with surgery.

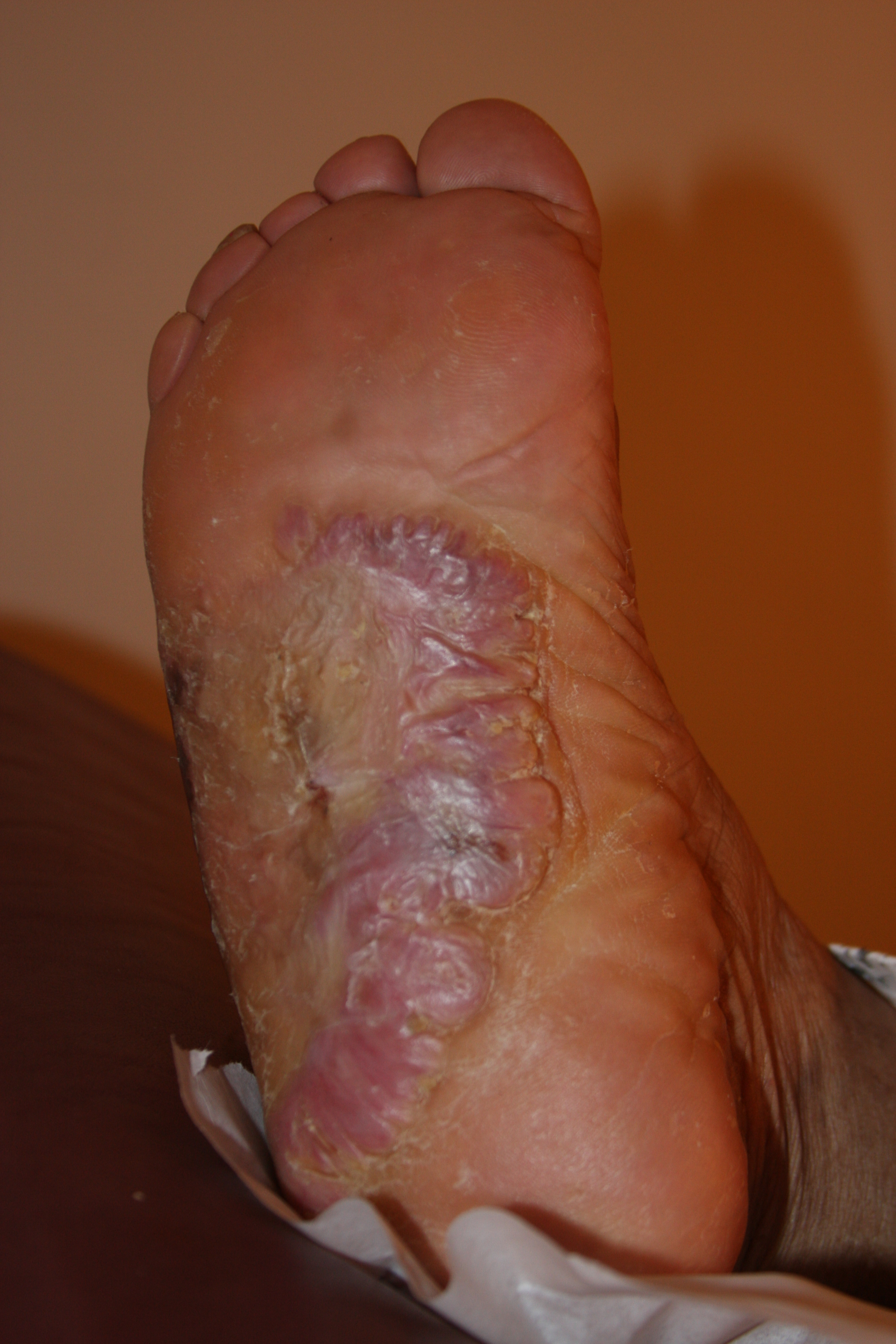
Keloid in the sole in a patient with large keloids elsewhere

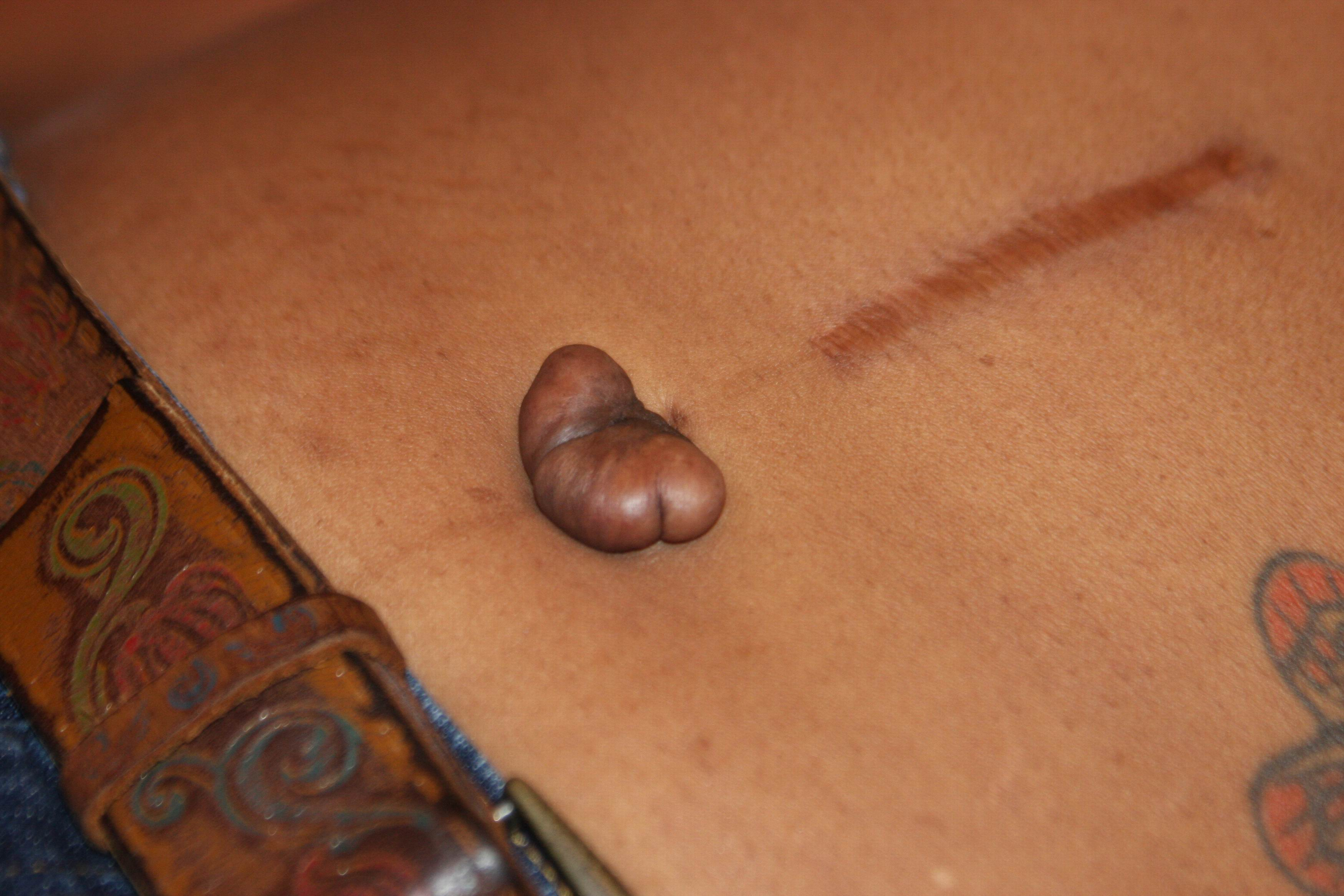
Well-healed midline scar of surgery, with keloid forming in the navel area following piercing

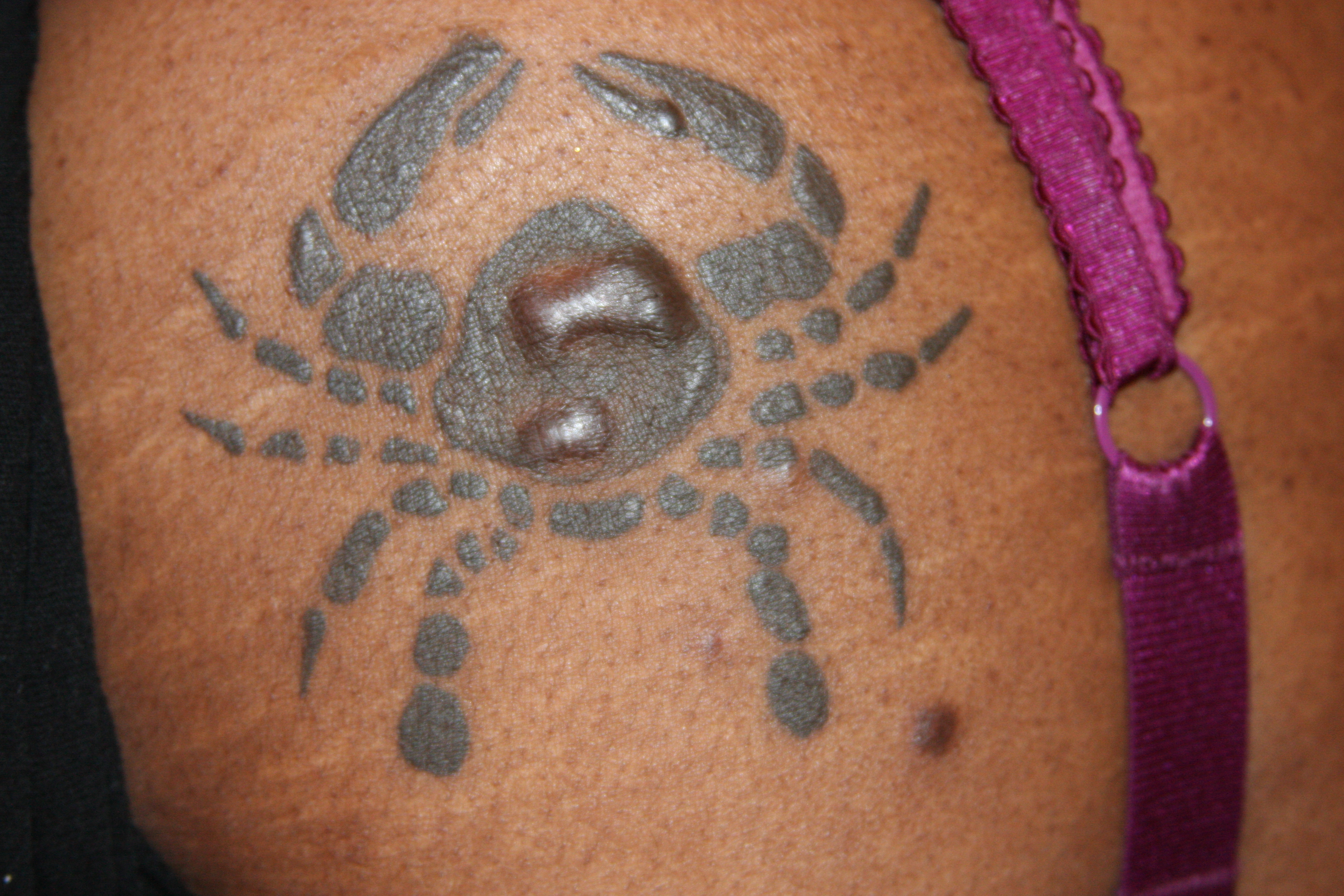
Keloid formation triggered by tattooing

== Location ==
Keloids can develop in any place where skin trauma has occurred. They can be the result of pimples, insect bites, scratching, burns, or other skin injuries. Keloid scars can develop after surgery. They are more common in some sites, such as the central chest (from a sternotomy), the back and shoulders (usually resulting from acne), and the ear lobes (from ear piercings). They can also occur on body piercings. The most common spots are the earlobes, arms, pelvic region, and over the collarbone.

== Cause ==
Most skin injury types can contribute to scarring. This includes burns, acne scars, chickenpox scars, ear piercing, scratches, surgical incisions, and vaccination sites.

According to the US National Center for Biotechnology Information, keloid scarring is common in young people between the ages of 10 and 20. Studies have shown that those with darker complexions are at a higher risk of keloid scarring as a result of skin trauma. They occur in 15–20% of individuals with sub-Saharan African, Asian, or Latino ancestry, significantly less in those of a Caucasian background. Although it was previously believed that people with albinism did not get keloids, a recent report described the incidence of keloids in Africans with albinism. Keloids tend to have a genetic component, which means one is more likely to have keloids if one or both of their parents have them.

No single gene has yet been identified as a causing factor in keloid scarring, although several susceptibility loci have been discovered, most notably in Chromosome 15.

== Genetics ==
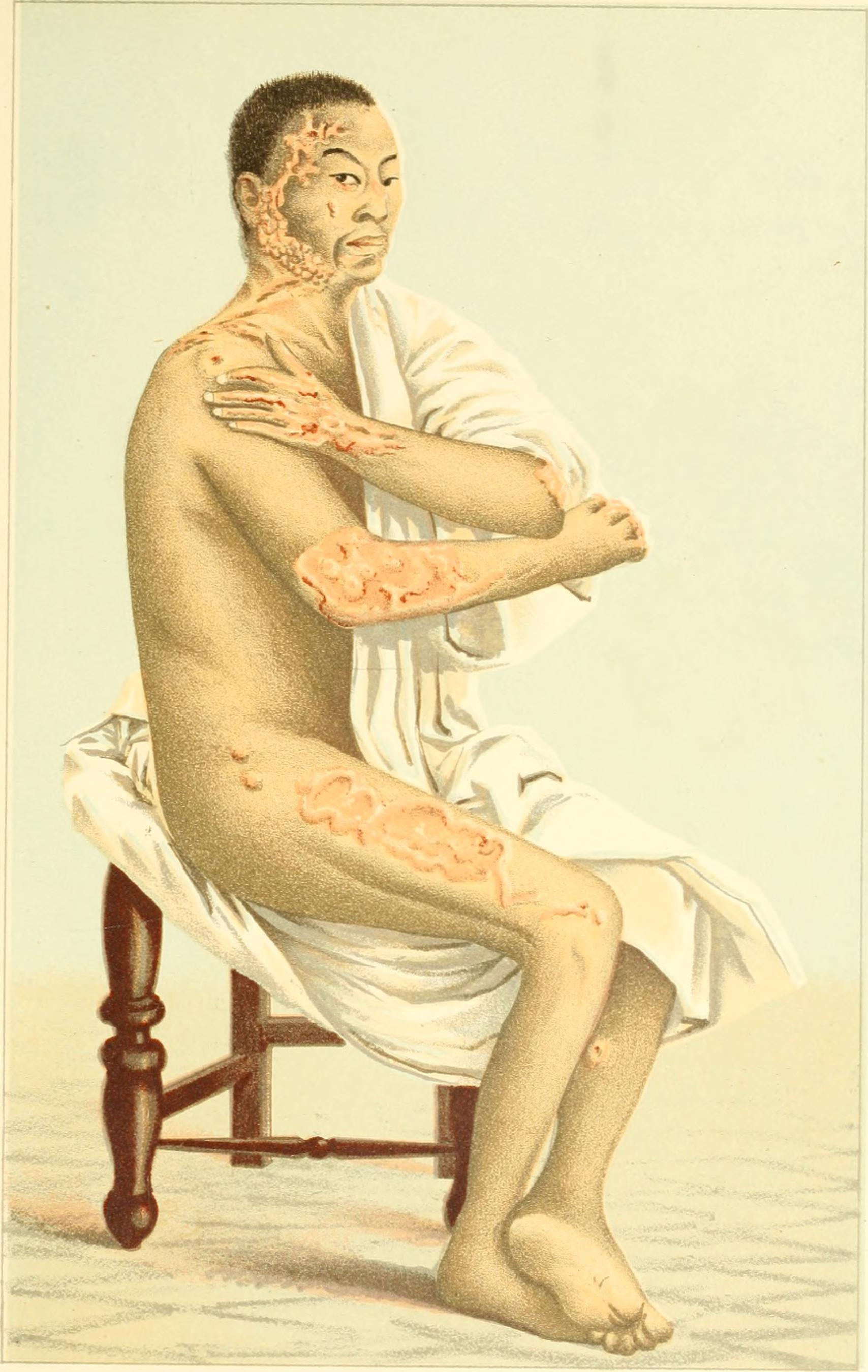
Japanese sailor with keloid scarring during the First Sino-Japanese War. People of Asian descent are among the groups more likely to develop keloid scars.

People who have ancestry from Sub-Saharan Africa, Asia, or Latin America are more likely to develop a keloid. Among ethnic Chinese in Asia, the keloid is the most common skin condition. In the United States, keloids are more common in African Americans and Hispanic Americans than European Americans. Those who have a family history of keloids are also susceptible since about 1/3 of people who get keloids have a first-degree blood relative (mother, father, sister, brother, or child) who also gets keloids. This family trait is most common in people of African and/or Asian descent.

The development of keloids among twins also lends credibility to the existence of a genetic susceptibility to develop keloids. Marneros et al. (1) reported four sets of identical twins with keloids; Ramakrishnan et al. also described a pair of twins who developed keloids at the same time after vaccination. Case series have reported clinically severe forms of keloids in individuals with positive family history and black African ethnic origin.

== Pathology ==
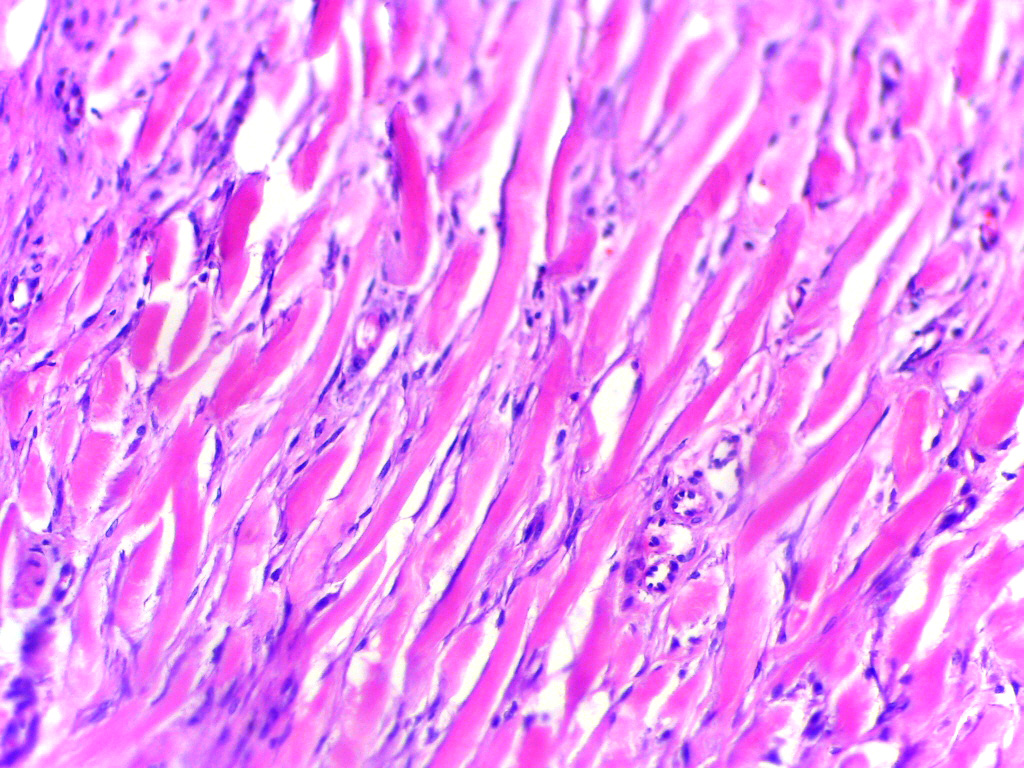
Micrograph of keloid. Thick, hyalinised collagen fibres are characteristic of this aberrant healing process. H&E stain.

Histologically, keloids are fibrotic tumors characterized by a collection of atypical fibroblasts with excessive deposition of extracellular matrix components, especially collagen, fibronectin, elastin, and proteoglycans. Generally, they contain relatively acellular centers and thick, abundant collagen bundles that form nodules in the deep dermal portion of the lesion. Keloids present a therapeutic challenge that must be addressed, as these lesions can cause significant pain, pruritus (itching), and physical disfigurement. They may not improve in appearance over time and can limit mobility if located over a joint.

Keloids affect all sexes equally, although the incidence in young female patients has been reported to be higher than in young males, probably reflecting the greater frequency of earlobe piercing among women. The frequency of occurrence is 15 times higher in highly pigmented people. People of African descent have an increased risk of keloid occurrences.

== Treatments ==
Prevention of keloid scars in patients with a known predisposition to them includes preventing unnecessary trauma or surgery (such as ear piercing and elective mole removal) whenever possible. Any skin problems in predisposed individuals (e.g., acne, infections) should be treated as early as possible to minimize areas of inflammation.

Treatments (both preventive and therapeutic) available are pressure therapy, silicone gel sheeting, intra-lesional triamcinolone acetonide (TAC), cryosurgery (freezing), radiation, pulsed dye laser (PDL), interferon (IFN), fluorouracil (5-FU) and surgical excision as well as a multitude of extracts and topical agents. Appropriate treatment of a keloid scar is age-dependent: radiotherapy, anti-metabolites, and corticosteroids would not be recommended to be used in children, to avoid harmful side effects, like growth abnormalities.

In adults, corticosteroids combined with 5-FU and PDL in triple therapy enhance results and diminish side effects.

Cryotherapy (or cryosurgery) refers to the application of extreme cold to treat keloids. This treatment method is easy to perform, effective, safe, and has the least chance of recurrence.

Surgical excision is currently still the most common treatment for a significant number of keloid lesions. However, when used as the solitary form of treatment, there is a large recurrence rate of between 70 and 100%. It has also been known to cause a larger lesion formation on recurrence. While not always successful alone, surgical excision when combined with other therapies dramatically decreases the recurrence rate. Examples of these therapies include but are not limited to radiation therapy, pressure therapy, and laser ablation. Pressure therapy following surgical excision has shown promising results, especially in keloids of the ear and earlobe. The mechanism of how exactly pressure therapy works is unknown at present, but many patients with keloid scars and lesions have benefited from it.

Intralesional injection with a corticosteroid such as triamcinolone acetonide does appear to aid in the reduction of fibroblast activity, inflammation and pruritus.

Tea tree oil, salt, or other topical oil does not affect keloid lesions.

A 2022 systematic review included multiple studies on laser therapy for treating keloid scars. There was not enough evidence for the review authors to determine if laser therapy was more effective than other treatments. They were also unable to conclude whether laser therapy leads to more harm than benefits compared with no treatment or different kinds of treatment.

Another 2022 systematic review compared silicone gel sheeting with no treatment, treatment with non-silicone gel sheeting, and treatment with intralesional injections of triamcinolone acetonide. The authors only found two small studies (36 participants in total) that compared these treatment options, so they were unable to determine which (if any) was more effective.

== Epidemiology ==
Hiroshima atomic bombing survivors showing numerous burn scars, including keloids

People of any age can develop a keloid. Children under 10 are less likely to develop keloids, even from ear piercing. Keloids may also develop from pseudofolliculitis barbae; continued shaving when one has razor bumps will irritate the bumps, infection, and over time, keloids will form. Persons with razor bumps are advised to stop shaving for the skin to repair itself before undertaking any form of hair removal. The tendency to form keloids is speculated to be hereditary. Keloids can tend to appear to grow over time without even piercing the skin, almost acting out a slow tumorous growth; the reason for this tendency is unknown.

Extensive burns, either thermal or radiological, can lead to unusually large keloids; these are especially common in firebombing casualties and were a signature effect of the atomic bombings of Hiroshima and Nagasaki.

The true incidence and prevalence of keloid in the United States are not known. Indeed, there has never been a population study to assess the epidemiology of this disorder. In his 2001 publication, Marneros stated that "reported incidence of keloids in the general population ranges from a high of 16% among the adults in the Democratic Republic of the Congo to a low of 0.09% in England," quoting from Bloom's 1956 publication on heredity of keloids. Clinical observations show that the disorder is more common among sub-Saharan Africans, African Americans and Asians, with unreliable and very wide estimated prevalence rates ranging from 4.5 to 16%.

== History ==
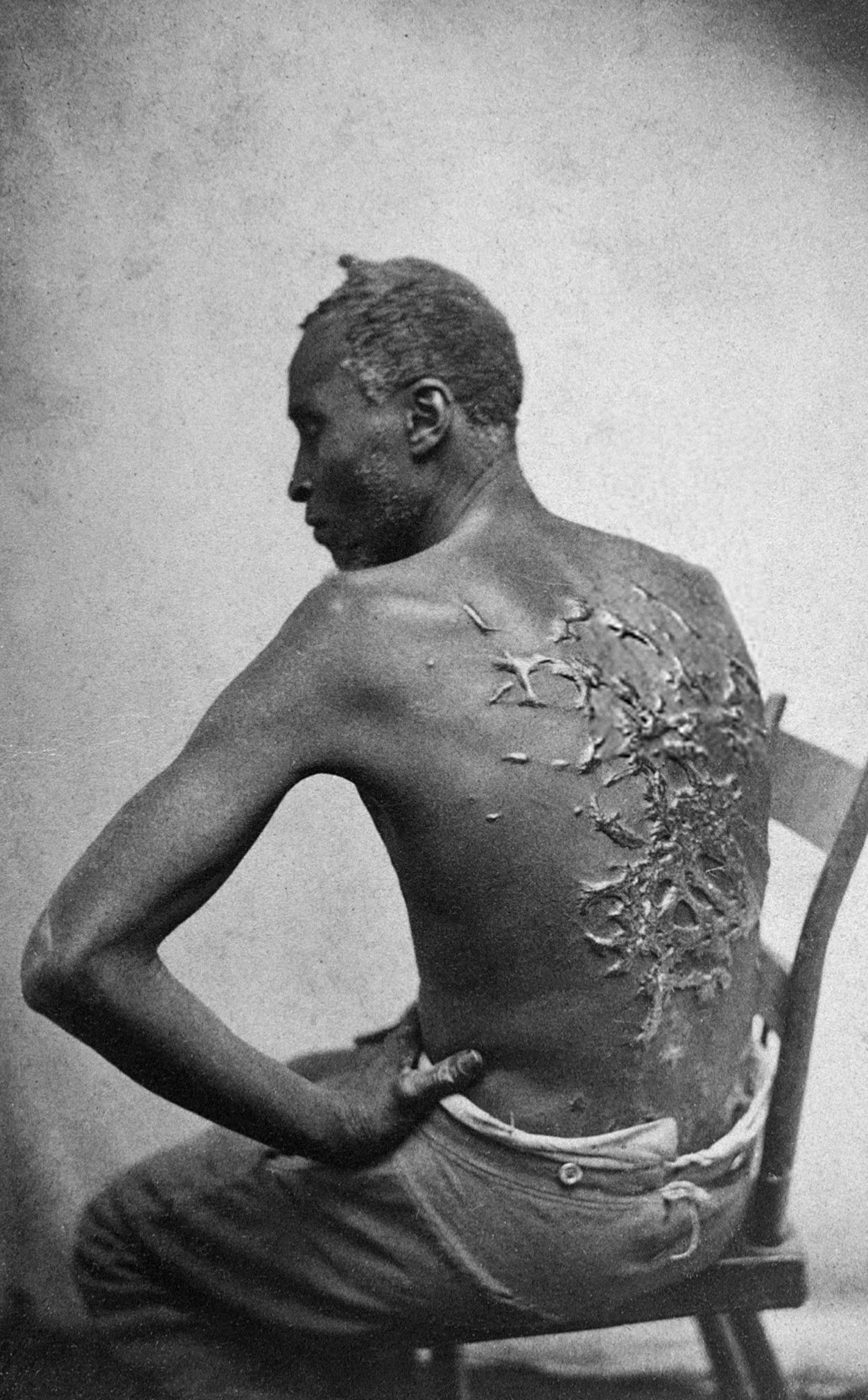
Gordon or "Whipped Peter", enslaved African American man displaying severe keloid scars

The word is derived from the Ancient Greek χηλή, chele, meaning "crab pincers", and the suffix -oid, meaning "like". In the 19th century it was known as the "Keloid of Alibert" as opposed to "Addison's keloid" (Morphea).

The famous American Civil War-era photograph "Whipped Peter" depicts an escaped former slave with extensive keloid scarring as a result of numerous brutal beatings from his former overseer.

Intralesional corticosteroid injections were introduced as a treatment in the mid-1960s as a method to attenuate scarring.

Pressure therapy has been used for the prophylaxis and treatment of keloids since the 1970s.

Topical silicone gel sheeting was introduced as a treatment in the early 1980s.
