= Acne conglobata =

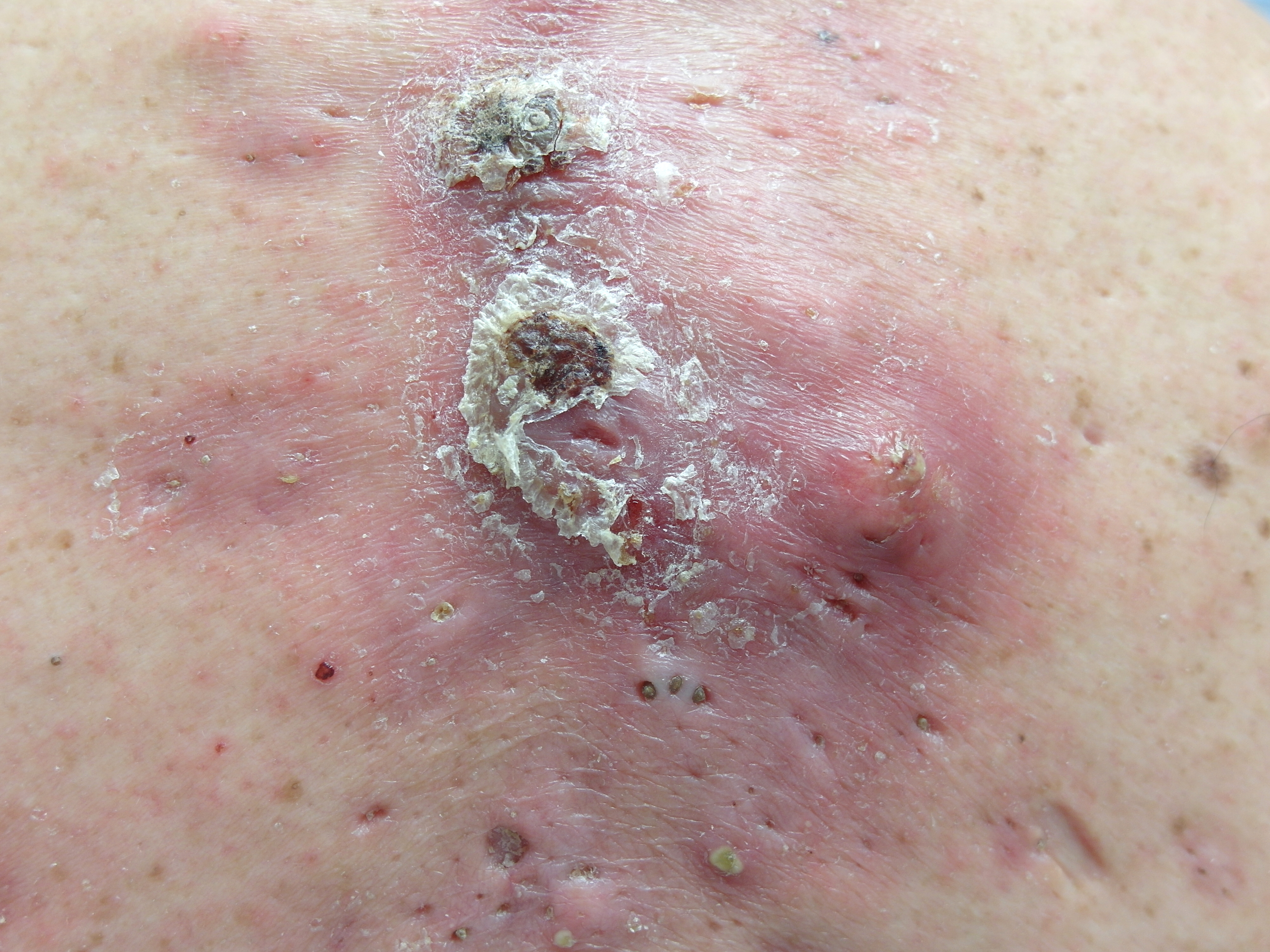
- Specialty: Dermatology

Acne conglobata is a highly inflammatory disease presenting with comedones, nodules, abscesses, and draining sinus tracts.

This condition generally begins between the ages of 18 and 30. It usually persists for a very long time, and often until the patient is around 40 years old. Although it often occurs where there is already an active acne problem, it can also happen to people whose acne has subsided. Although the cause of this type of acne is unknown, it is associated with testosterone and thus appears mainly in males. It can be caused by anabolic steroid abuse and sometimes appears in males after stopping testosterone therapy. It can also happen to someone who has a tumor that is releasing large amounts of androgens, or to people in remission from diseases, such as leukemia. In certain persons, the condition may be triggered by exposure to aromatic hydrocarbons or ingestion of halogens.

== Presentation ==
Acne conglobata is a severe, inflammatory variant of acne. Inflammatory papules, papulonodules, nodules and pustules may coalesce, and abscesses in the skin may form sinuses that interconnect. Bleeding or drainage of acneiform plaques may be present. The systemic findings seen in acne fulminans are not present. A component of the follicular occlusion tetrad, acne conglobata may be seen with hidradenitis suppurativa, pilonidal disease and dissecting cellulitis of the scalp. The face, chest, back and buttocks may be involved.

== Treatment ==
The most common treatment is the acne medication isotretinoin. It may be combined with prednisone. Antibiotics such as dapsone, tetracycline or erythromycin may also be prescribed. An option to treat with carbon dioxide laser therapy, followed by topical tretinoin therapy has been described.

Surgery may be necessary to remove large nodules. Alternatively, nodules can be injected with corticosteroids such as triamcinolone.

== See also ==
- List of cutaneous conditions
