= Trichilemmal cyst =

Common cyst that forms from a hair follicle

- Other names: Wen, pilar cyst, or isthmus-catagen cyst
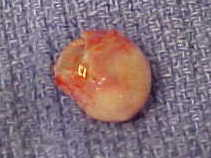
- Trichilemmal cyst: Note the thick, durable, white shell
- Specialty: Dermatology

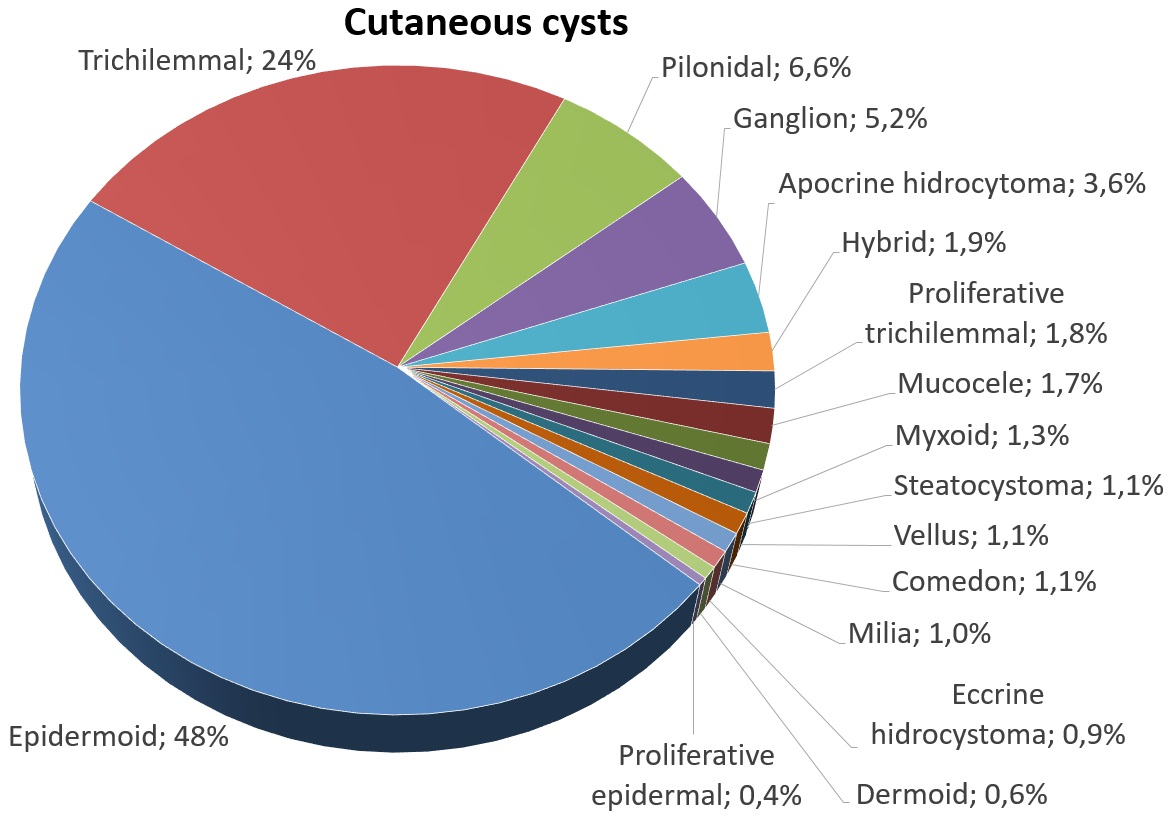
Relative incidence of cutaneous cysts: Trichilemmal cyst is labeled near top.

A trichilemmal cyst (or pilar cyst) is a common cyst that forms from a hair follicle, most often on the scalp, and is smooth, mobile, and filled with keratin, a protein component found in hair, nails, skin, and horns. Trichilemmal cysts are clinically and histologically distinct from trichilemmal horns, hard tissue that is much rarer and not limited to the scalp. Rarely, these cysts may grow more extensively and form rapidly multiplying trichilemmal tumors, also called proliferating trichilemmal cysts, which are benign, but may grow aggressively at the cyst site. Very rarely, trichilemmal cysts can become cancerous.

== Classification ==
Trichilemmal cysts may be classified as sebaceous cysts, although technically speaking are not sebaceous. "True" sebaceous cysts, which originate from sebaceous glands and which contain sebum, are relatively rare and are known as steatocystoma simplex or, if multiple, as steatocystoma multiplex. Medical professionals have suggested that the term "sebaceous cyst" be avoided since it can be misleading. In practice, however, the term is still often used for epidermoid and pilar cysts.

== Pathogenesis ==
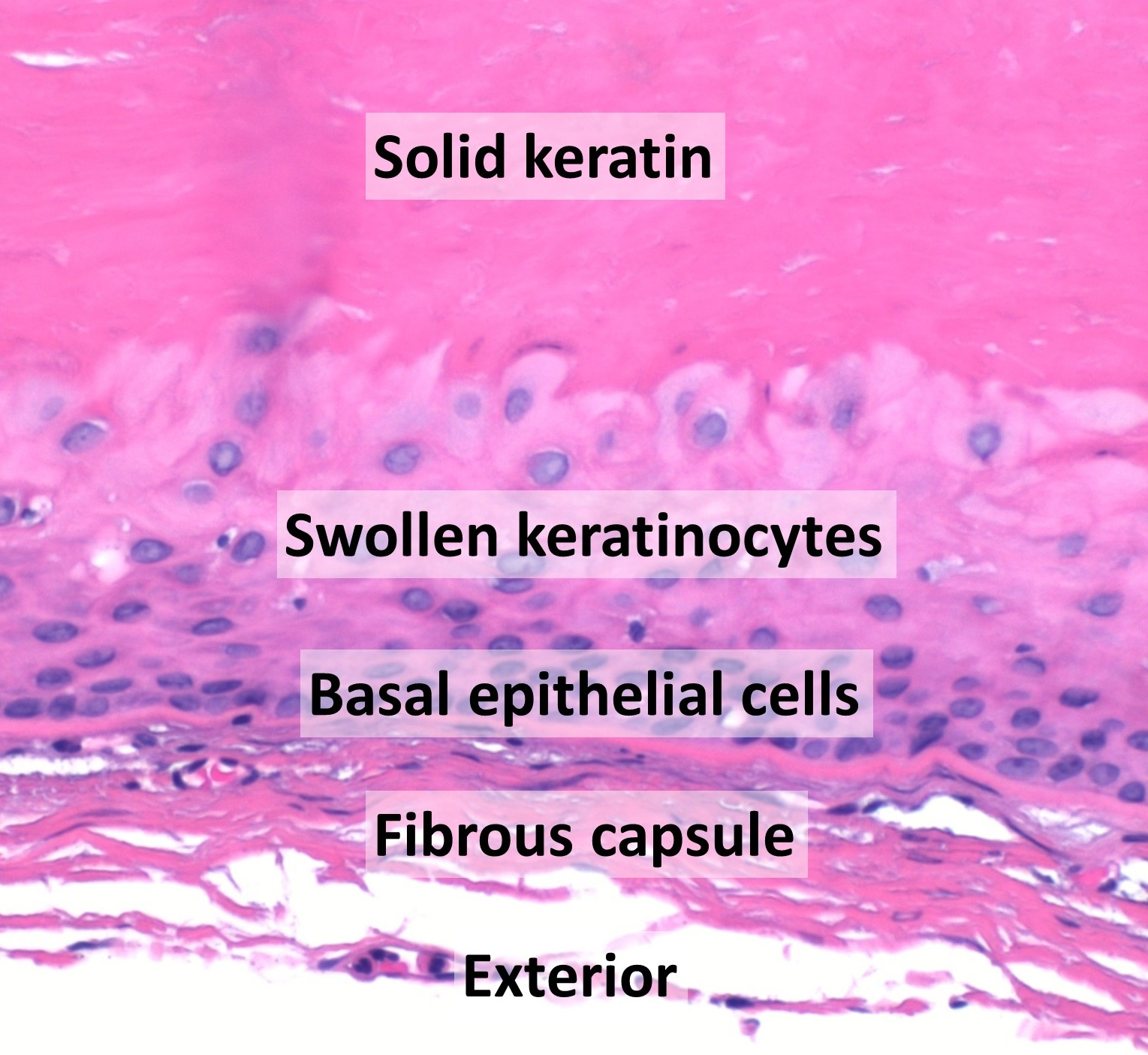
Histopathology of a trichilemmal cyst, from internal (top) to external (bottom): Solid eosinophilic-staining keratin.; Swollen pale keratinocytes, which increase in height closer to the interior.; Small, cuboidal, dark-staining basal epithelial cells in a palisade arrangement, with no distinct intercellular bridging.; Fibrous capsule.; There is no granular cell layer (in contrast to an epidermoid cyst).

Trichilemmal cysts are derived from the outer root sheath of the hair follicle. Their origin is currently unknown, but they may be produced by budding from the external root sheath as a genetically determined structural aberration. They arise preferentially in areas of high hair follicle concentrations, so 90% of cases occur on the scalp. They are solitary in 30% and multiple in 70% of cases.

Histologically, they are lined by stratified squamous epithelium that lacks a granular cell layer and are filled with compact "wet" keratin. Areas consistent with proliferation can be found in some cysts. In rare cases, this leads to formation of a tumor, known as a proliferating trichilemmal cyst. The tumor is clinically benign, although it may display nuclear atypia, dyskeratotic cells, and mitotic figures. These features can be misleading, and a diagnosis of squamous-cell carcinoma may be mistakenly rendered.

== Treatment ==
Minimal excision is appropriate to treat for some trichilemmal cysts, while others require formal surgical excision. The method of treatment varies depending on the physician's training. Most physicians perform the procedure under local anesthetic. Others prefer a more conservative approach. This involves the use of a small punch biopsy about one-fourth the diameter of the cyst. The punch biopsy is used to enter the cyst cavity. The contents of the cyst are emptied, leaving an empty sac. As the pilar cyst wall is the thickest and most durable of the many varieties of cysts, it can be grabbed with forceps and pulled out of the small incision. This method is best performed on cysts larger than a pea that have formed a thick enough wall to be easily identified after the sac is emptied. Small cysts have thin walls, so are easily fragmented on traction. This increases the likelihood of cyst recurrence. This method often results in only a small scar, and very little if any bleeding.

== See also ==
- Proliferating epidermoid cyst
- List of cutaneous conditions
