= Epidermoid cyst =

Benign cyst usually found on the skin

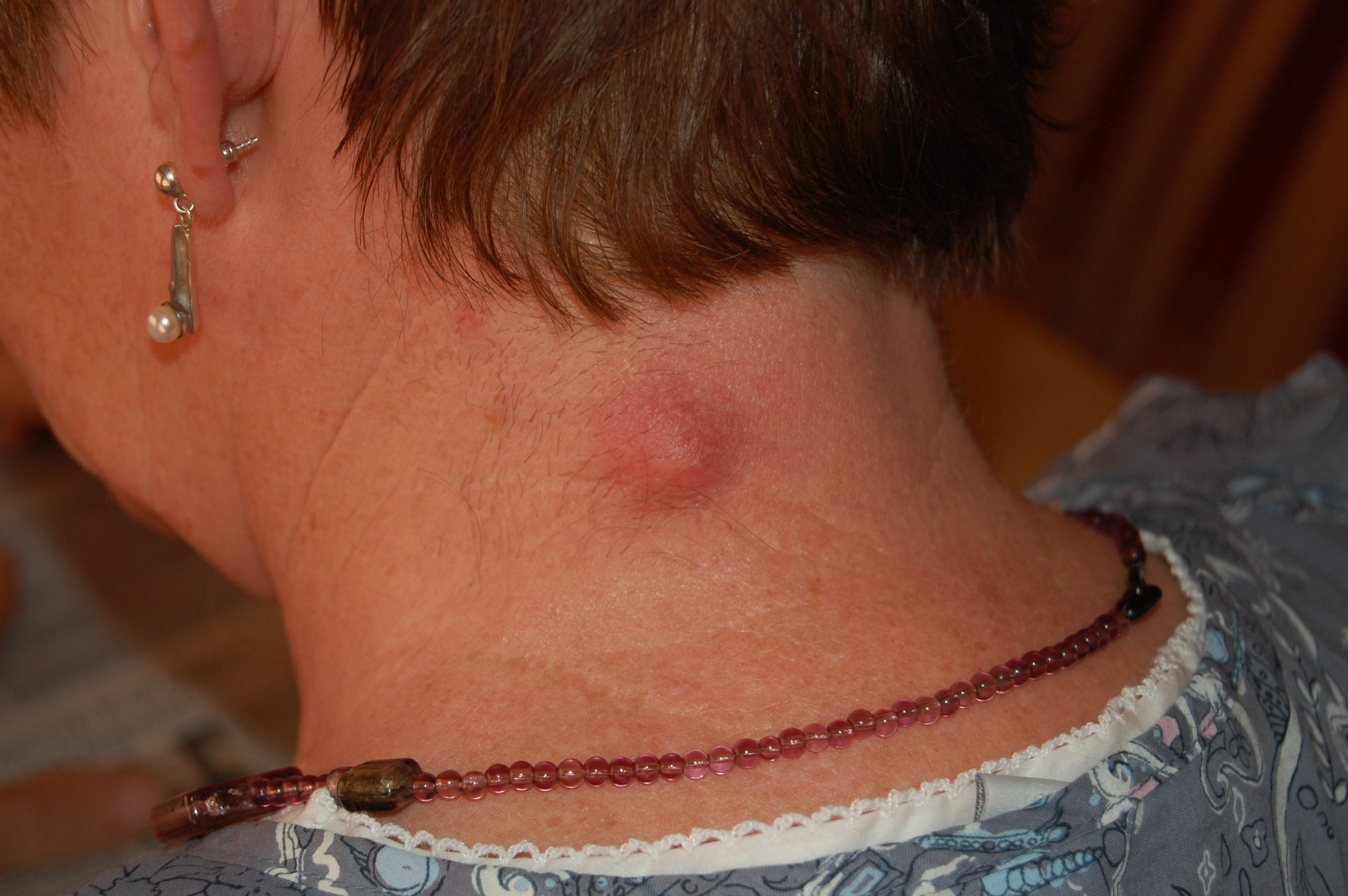
- Epidermal cyst on the neck, inflamed
- Specialty: Dermatology

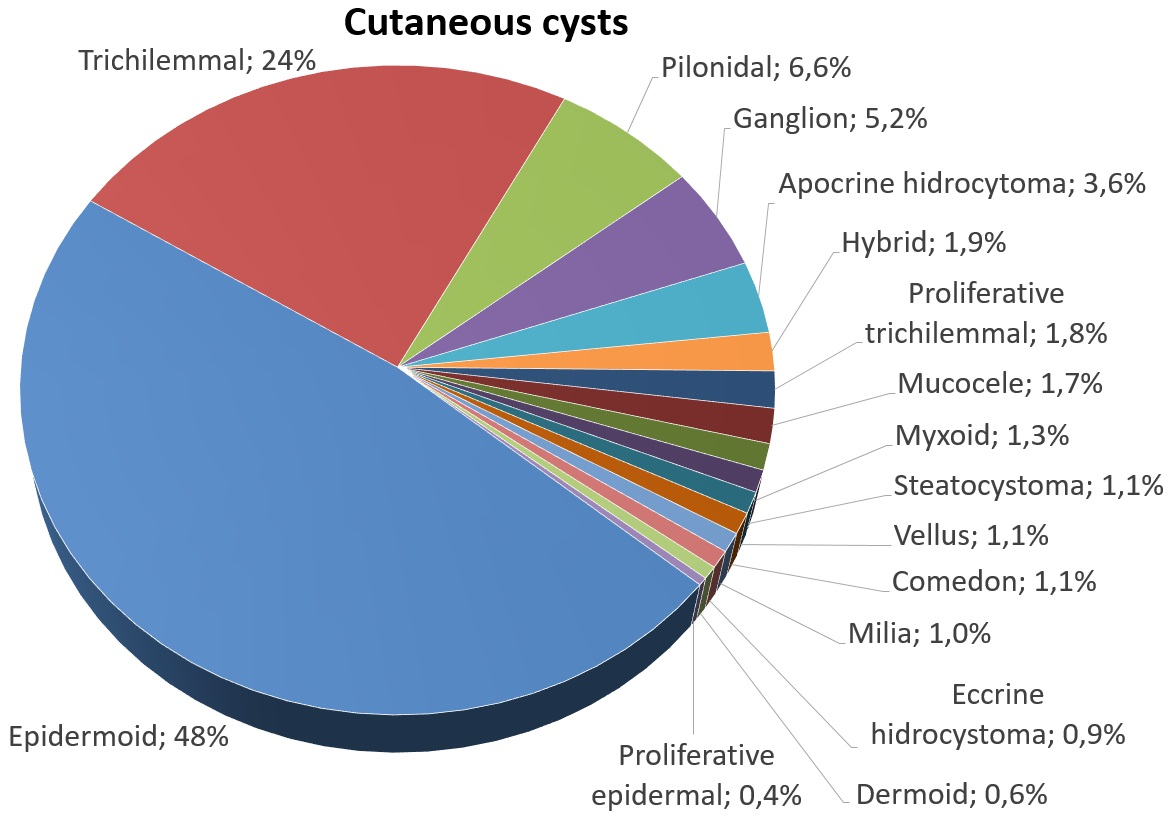
Relative incidence of cutaneous cysts, where epidermoid cysts constitute a plurality (blue area)

An epidermoid cyst or epidermal inclusion cyst is a benign cyst usually found on the skin. The cyst develops out of ectodermal tissue. Histologically, it is made of a thin layer of squamous epithelium.

== Signs and symptoms ==
The epidermoid cyst may have no symptoms, or it may be painful when touched. It can release macerated keratin. In contrast to pilar cysts, epidermoid cysts are usually present on parts of the body with relatively little hair. Some vaginal cysts are epidermoid cysts.

Although they are not malignant, there are rare cases of malignant tumors arising from an epidermoid cyst. Epidermal inclusion cysts account for approximately 85–95% of all excised cysts; malignant transformation is exceedingly rare. The incidence of squamous cell carcinoma developing from an epidermal inclusion cyst has been estimated to range from 0.011 to 0.045%.

== Diagnosis ==
Epidermoid cysts are usually diagnosed when a person notices a bump on their skin and seeks medical attention. The definitive diagnosis is made after excision by a pathologist based on microscopic appearance of a cystic lesion lined by cornified epithelium containing lamellated keratin without calcifications. They can also be seen as isointense lesions on MRI or hyperintensities on FLAIR.

== Treatment ==
Cysts can be removed by excision.

In case of fronto-ethmoidal epidermoid cysts, surgical resection appears to be the mainstay of treatment; however, the extent of resection is dictated by adherence of the tumor capsule to the surrounding vital structures.

Hydrogen peroxide gel (H_{2}O_{2}) was previously recommended for cyst treatment, particularly those on body piercings. However the gel cannot adequately permeate the cyst and was not found to be effective. Hydrogen peroxide is no longer recommended for wound care by doctors as it can damage the healing tissues.

On body piercings, self treatment with a hot saline soak to help drain the cyst and the use of an antibacterial or medicated talcum powder to help dry out the bump and reduce bacterial proliferation is generally recommended until medical advice can be obtained. (Use of talc is no longer recommended due to recently discovered associations with multiple cancers.) Piercings, however, are more likely to be victims of hypertrophic scarring than a cyst. Cheek piercings seem to be the piercing most prone to cysts due to the possible interruption of saliva ducts.

== Terminology ==
Several synonyms exist for epidermoid cysts, including epidermal cyst, infundibular cyst, keratin cyst and epidermal inclusion cyst Epidermal inclusion cyst more specifically refers to implantation of epidermal elements into the dermis. The term infundibular cyst refers to the site of origin of the cyst: the infundibular portion of the hair follicle. The majority of epidermal inclusion cysts originate from the infundibular portion of the hair follicle, thus explaining the interchangeable, yet inaccurate, use of these two terms.

Epidermoid cyst may be classified as a sebaceous cyst, although technically speaking it is not sebaceous. "True" sebaceous cysts, cysts which originate from sebaceous glands and which contain sebum, are relatively rare and are known as steatocystoma simplex or, if multiple, as steatocystoma multiplex. Medical professionals have suggested that the term sebaceous cyst be avoided since it can be misleading. In practice, however, the term is still often used for epidermoid and pilar cysts.

== Additional images ==
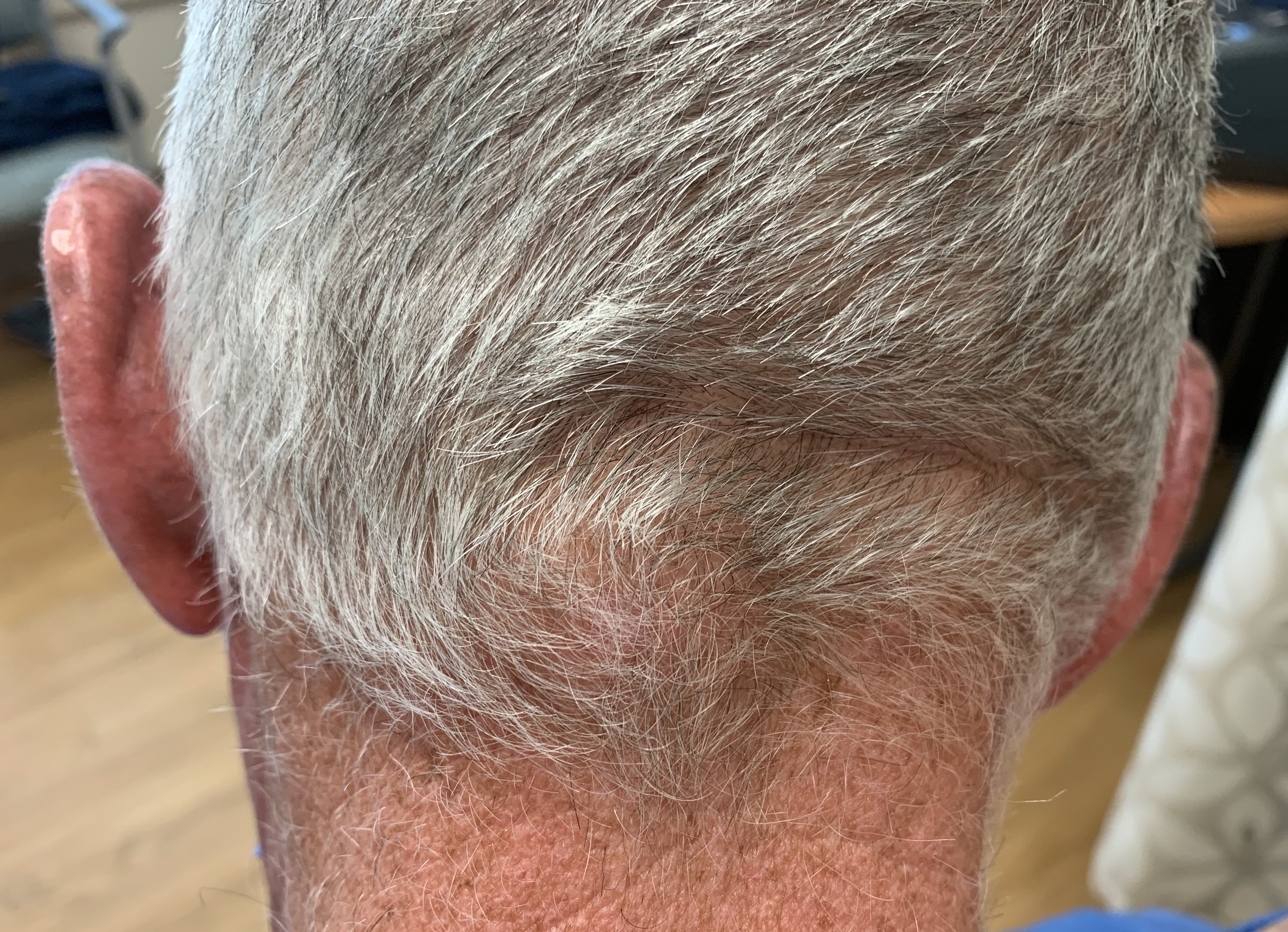
Epidermal inclusion cyst on the nape of a person's neck

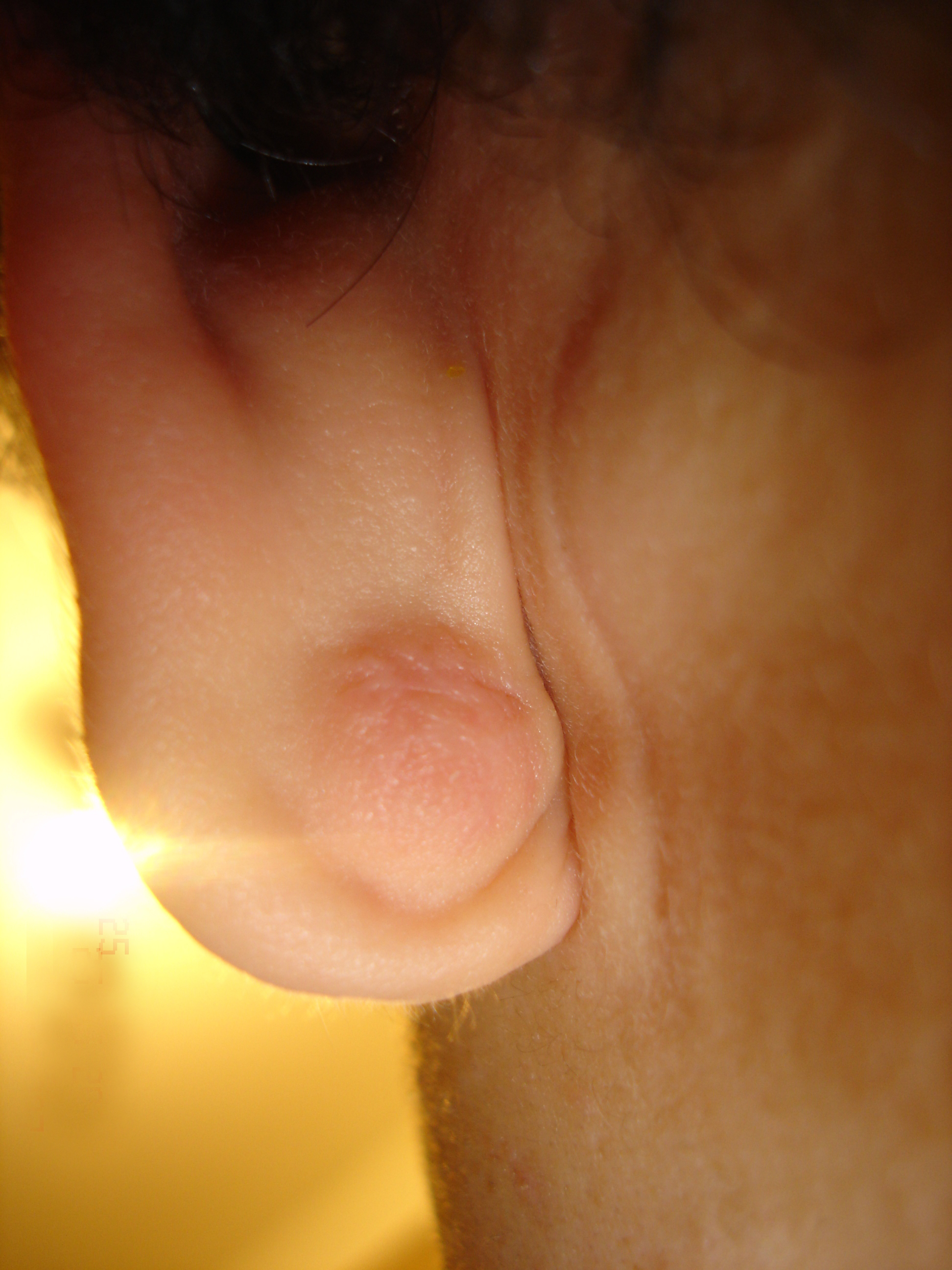
Epidermal cyst in the earlobe
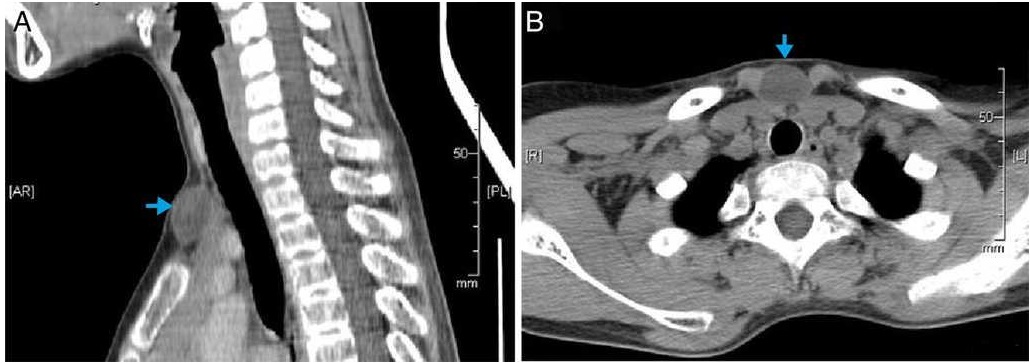
CT scan, showing a homogenous hypodense volume (unspecific cyst-like)

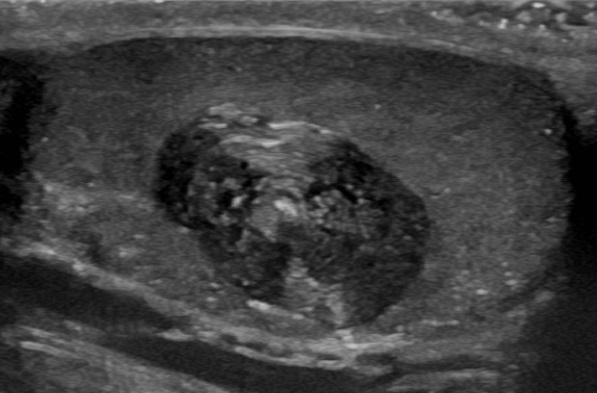
Epidermoid cyst in a testicle on ultrasound, with lamellated ("onion skin") appearance

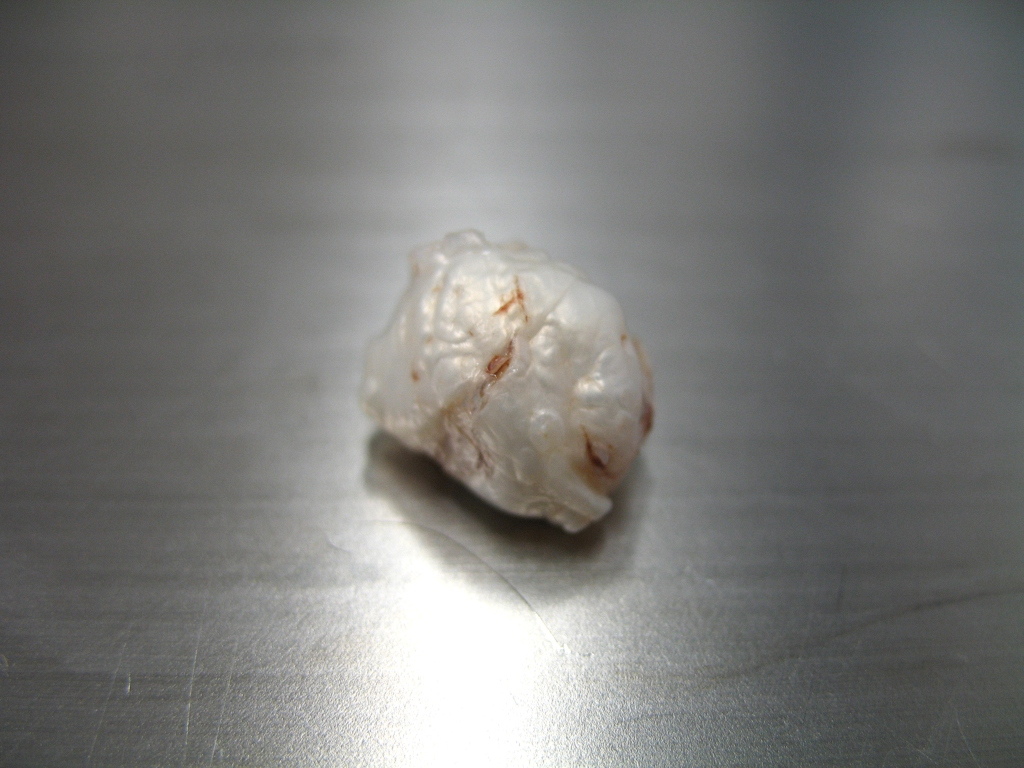
Macroscopic appearance of a resected (surgically removed) intracranial cyst, with pearl appearance

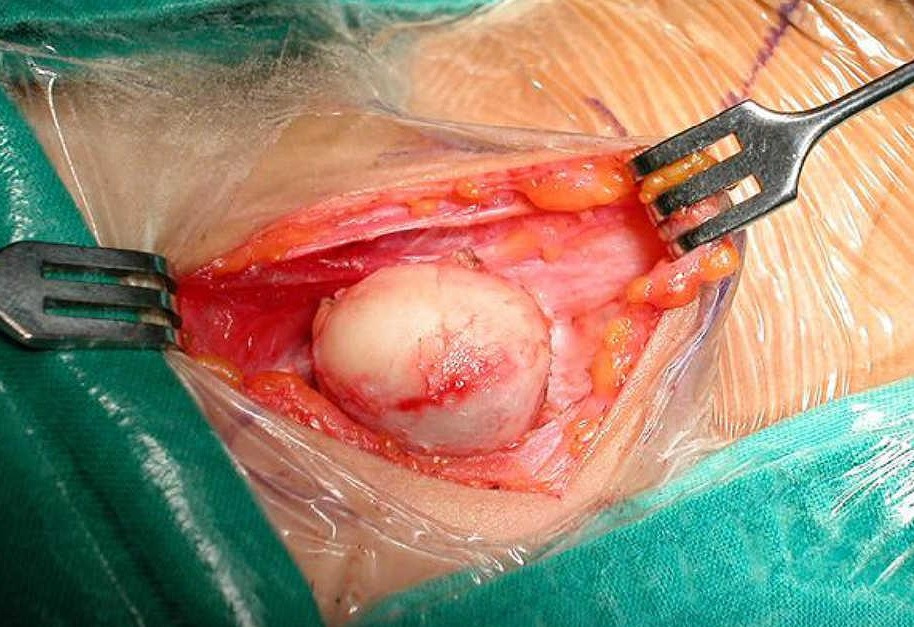
Surgery of a suprasternal epidermoid cyst, showing a smooth surface

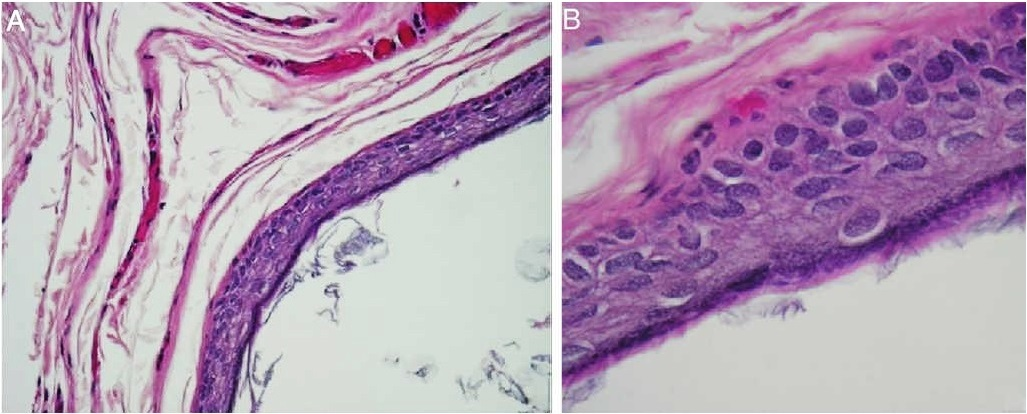
Histopathology, showing a keratinizing stratified squamous epithelium, and a lumen containing keratin flakes

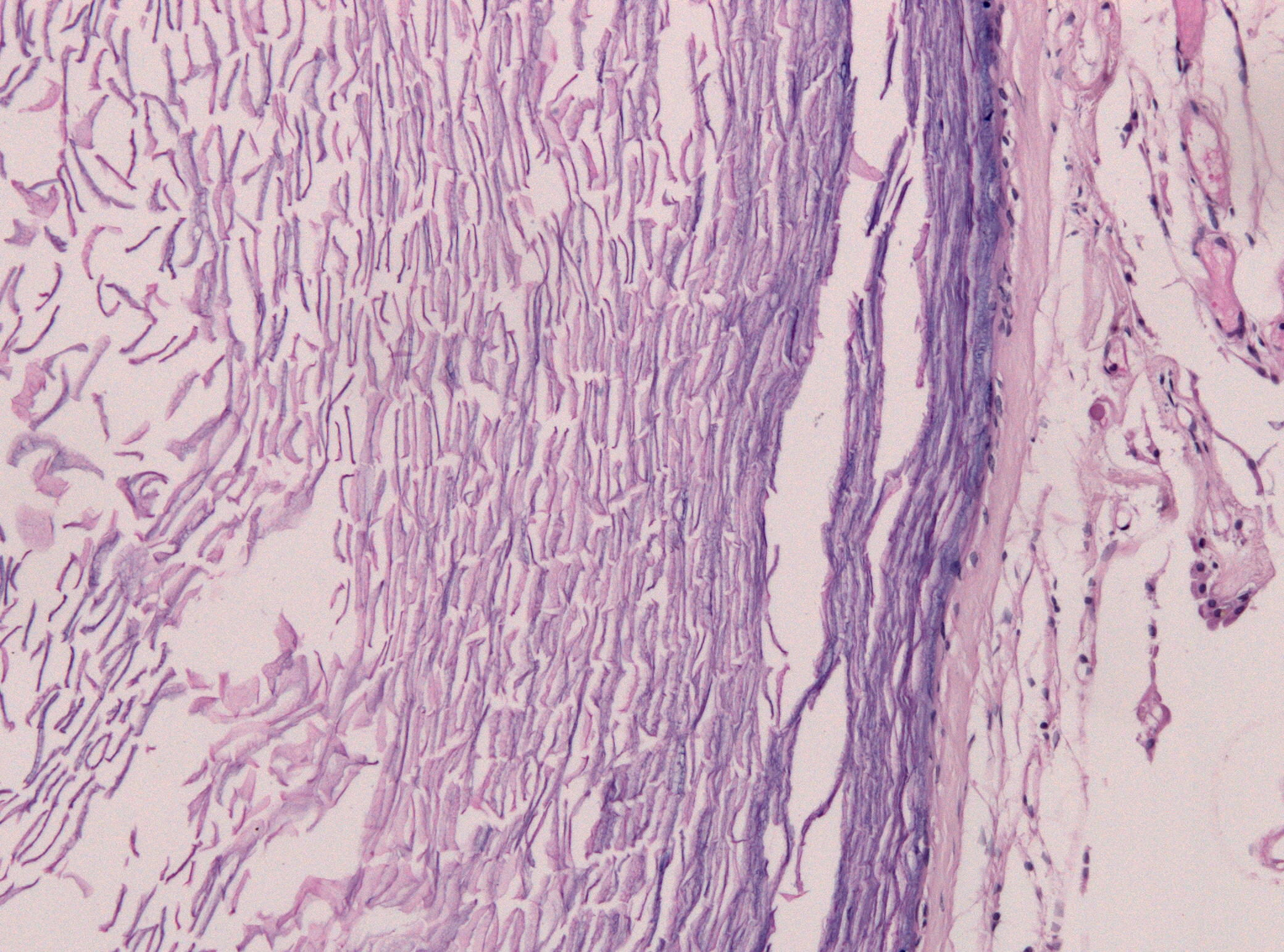
Histopathology showing epithelium and lamellated keratin (left)

== See also ==
- Intracranial epidermoid cyst
- List of cutaneous neoplasms associated with systemic syndromes
- Proliferating epidermoid cyst
- Verrucous cyst
