= Sebaceous cyst =

Term for several types of skin cyst

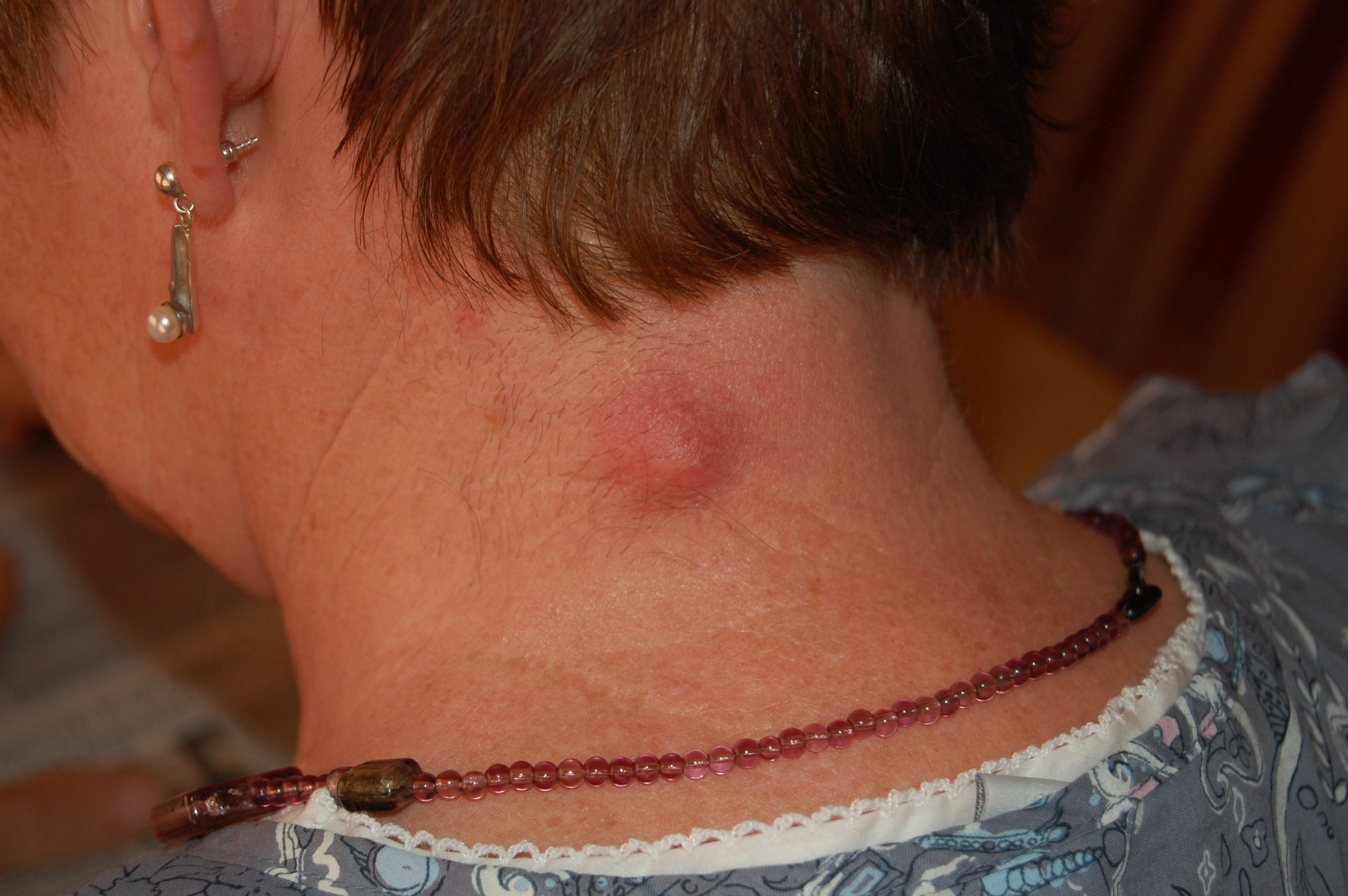
- Pronunciation: /sɪˈbeɪʃəs sɪst/
- Specialty: Dermatology, general surgery

A sebaceous cyst is a term commonly used to refer to either:

- Epidermoid cysts (also termed epidermal cysts, infundibular cyst)
- Pilar cysts (also termed trichelemmal cysts, isthmus-catagen cysts)

Both of the above types of cysts contain keratin, not sebum, and neither originates from sebaceous glands. Epidermoid cysts originate in the epidermis and pilar cysts originate from hair follicles. Technically speaking, then, they are not sebaceous cysts. "True" sebaceous cysts, which originate from sebaceous glands and which contain sebum, are relatively rare and are known as steatocystoma simplex or, if multiple, as steatocystoma multiplex.

Medical professionals have suggested that the term "sebaceous cyst" be avoided since it can be misleading. In practice, however, the term is still often used for epidermoid and pilar cysts.

== Signs and symptoms ==
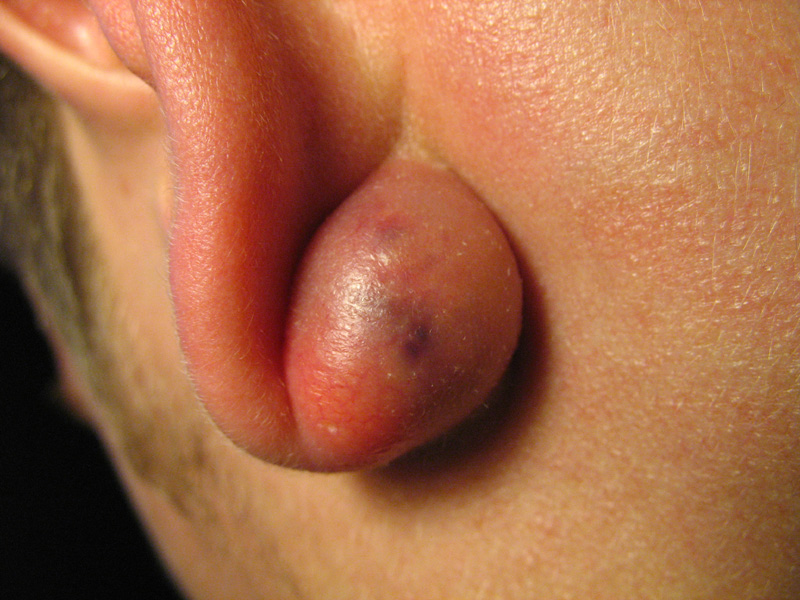
Close-up of an infected sebaceous cyst located behind the ear lobe

The scalp, ears, back, face, and upper arm are common sites of sebaceous cysts, though they may occur anywhere on the body except the palms of the hands and soles of the feet. They are more common in hairier areas, where in cases of long duration they could result in hair loss on the skin surface immediately above the cyst. They are smooth to the touch, vary in size, and are generally round in shape.

They are generally mobile masses that can consist of:

- Fibrous tissues and fluids
- A fatty (keratinous) substance that resembles cottage cheese, in which case the cyst may be called "keratin cyst" – this material has a characteristic "cheesy" or foot odor smell
- A somewhat viscous, serosanguineous fluid (containing purulent and bloody material)

The nature of the contents of a sebaceous cyst, and of its surrounding capsule, differs depending on whether the cyst has ever been infected.

With surgery, a cyst can usually be excised in its entirety. Poor surgical technique, or previous infection leading to scarring and tethering of the cyst to the surrounding tissue, may lead to rupture during excision and removal. A completely removed cyst will not recur, though if the patient has a predisposition to cyst formation, further cysts may develop in the same general area.

== Causes ==
Cysts may be related to high levels of testosterone, hence may be more frequent in users of anabolic steroids.

Hereditary causes of sebaceous cysts include Gardner's syndrome and basal cell nevus syndrome.

== Types ==
=== Pilar cyst ===
About 90% of pilar cysts occur on the scalp, with the remaining sometimes occurring on the face, trunk, and extremities. Pilar cysts are significantly more common in females, and a tendency to develop these cysts is often inherited in an autosomal dominant pattern. In most cases, multiple pilar cysts appear at once.

== Treatment ==
Sebaceous cysts generally do not require medical treatment. However, if they continue to grow, they may become unsightly, painful, and/or infected.

=== Surgical ===
Surgical excision of a sebaceous cyst is a simple procedure to completely remove the sac and its contents, although it should be performed when inflammation is minimal.

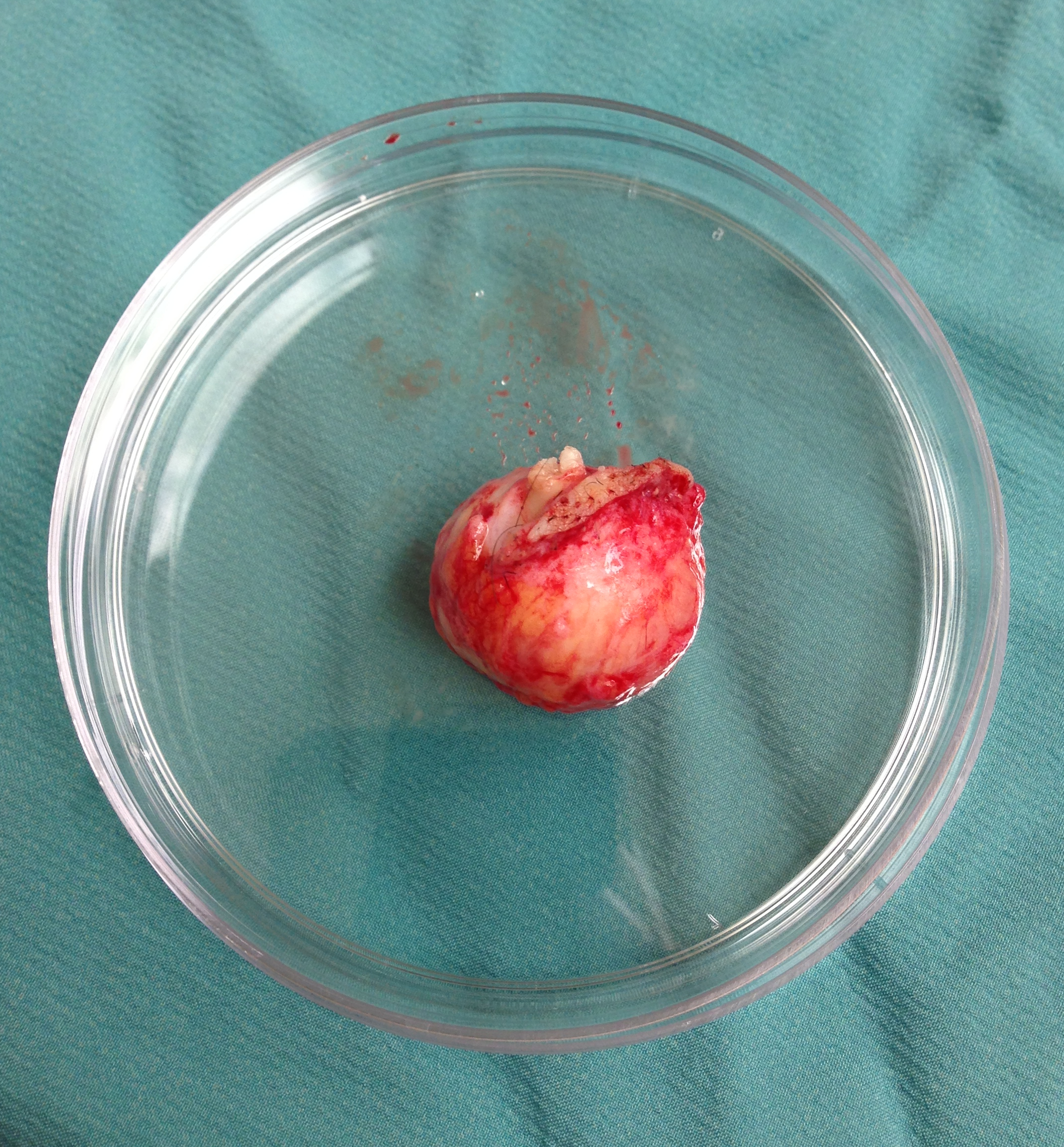
A sebaceous cyst that has been surgically removed

Three general approaches are used - traditional wide excision, minimal excision, and punch biopsy excision.

The typical outpatient surgical procedure for cyst removal is to numb the area around the cyst with a local anaesthetic, then to use a scalpel to open the lesion with either a single cut down the center of the swelling, or an oval cut on both sides of the center point. If the cyst is small, it may be lanced, instead. The person performing the surgery will squeeze out the contents of the cyst, then use blunt-headed scissors or another instrument to hold the incision wide open while using fingers or forceps to try to remove the cyst wall intact. If the cyst wall can be removed in one piece, the "cure rate" is 100%. If, however, it is fragmented and cannot be entirely recovered, the operator may use curettage (scraping) to remove the remaining exposed fragments, then burn them with an electrocauterization tool, in an effort to destroy them in place. In such cases, the cyst may recur. In either case, the incision is then disinfected, and if necessary, the skin is stitched back together over it. A scar will most likely result.

An infected cyst may require oral antibiotics or other treatment before or after excision. If pus has already formed, then incision and drainage should be done along with avulsion of the cyst wall with proper antibiotics coverage.

An approach involving incision, rather than excision, has also been proposed.
