= Steatocystoma =

Steatocystoma may refer to:

- Steatocystoma simplex
- Steatocystoma multiplex
