= Milia-like calcinosis =

- Specialty: Dermatology

Milia-like calcinosis is a cutaneous condition characterized by small, milia-like lesions that develop on the dorsal surface of the hands and the face.

== See also ==
- Milia en plaque
- List of cutaneous conditions
