= Verrucous cyst =

- Other names: Cystic papillomas
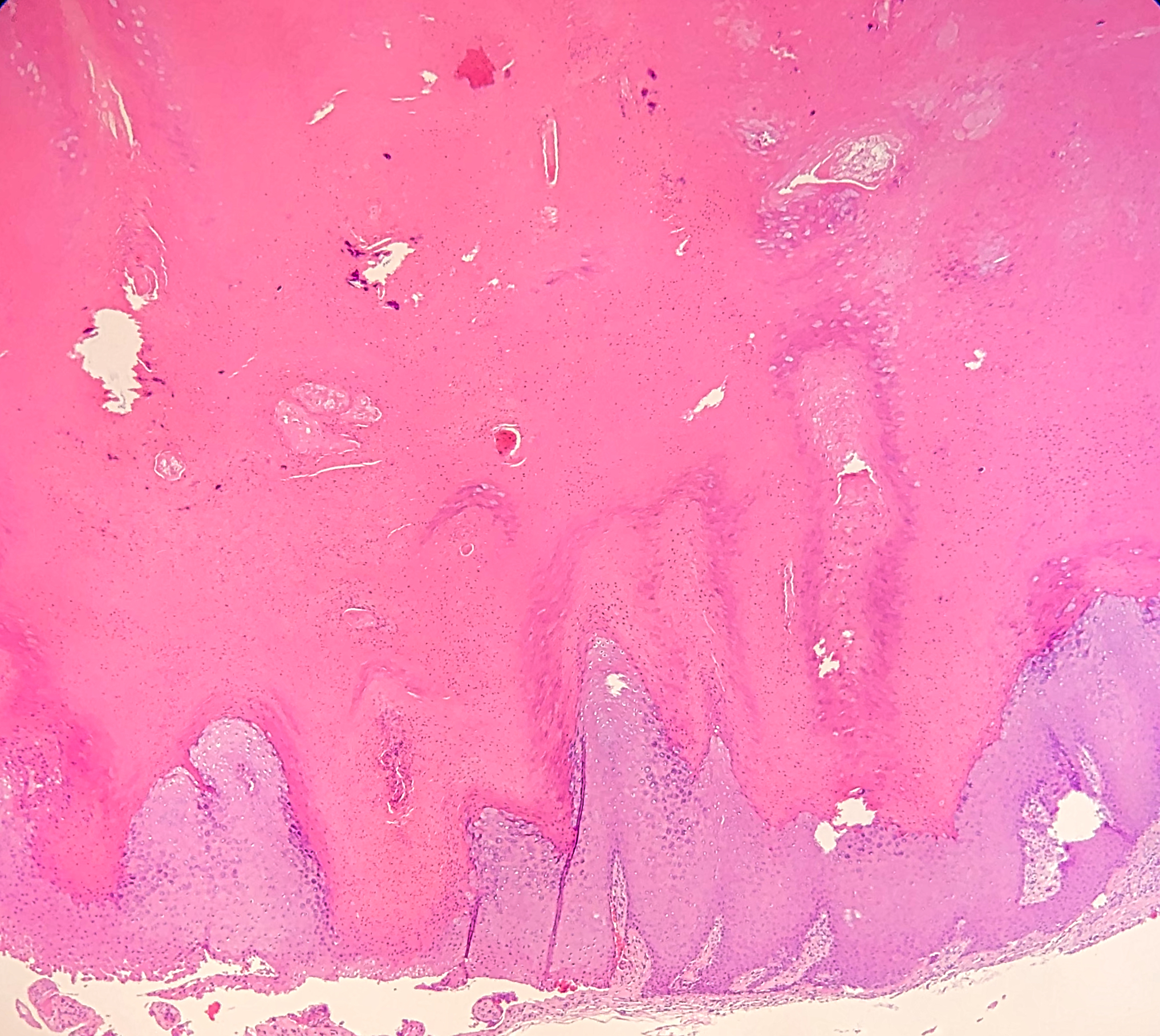
- Upper back of a middle-aged man. Present for years.
- Specialty: Dermatology

Verrucous cysts are a cutaneous condition that resemble epidermoid cysts except that the lining demonstrates papillomatosis.

== See also ==
- Milia
- Skin lesion
