= Eruptive vellus hair cyst =

Skin condition

Eruptive vellus hair cysts (or EVHC) are small lesions that occur most often in the chest wall, abdomen and extremities, often with a crusted surface. EVHC may occur randomly, or it can be inherited as an autosomal dominant trait; sporadic cases usually appear at 4–18 years of age. The cysts appear similar clinically to steatocystoma multiplex, as well as acneiform eruptions and milia. Histopathology is the basis of diagnosis. Retinoids, surgery, and lasers are used as treatment modalities.

== Signs/symptoms ==
Eruptive vellus hair cysts are small lesions that occur most often in the chest wall, abdomen and extremities, often with a crusted surface. It was first described in 1977. The cysts appear similar clinically to steatocystoma multiplex, as well as acneiform eruptions and milia.

== Cause ==
EVHC may occur randomly, or it can be inherited as an autosomal dominant trait. The condition affects males and females equally, and sporadic cases usually appear at 4–18 years of age.

== Diagnosis ==
Histopathology is the basis of diagnosis. Stratified-squamous epithelium with a granular layer that surrounding a cystic space filled with laminated keratin and a variable number of vellus hair cysts is seen to be present. It can be difficult to distinguish from other skin conditions, including molluscum contagiosum and acne vulgaris but can be corroborated with histopathology.

=== Associations ===
It can be associated with Steatocystoma multiplex.

== Treatment ==
Therapeutic techniques that are safe and effective are rare, with incision and drainage being the primary form of treatment when sporadic regression does not occur. The primary indication for treatment is cosmesis. Retinoids, surgery, and lasers are used as treatment modalities.

== See also ==
- Steatocystoma simplex
- Milia
- List of cutaneous conditions
