= Milia en plaque =

- Specialty: Dermatology

Milia en plaque is a cutaneous condition characterized by multiple milia within an erythematous edematous plaque.

== See also ==
- Micronodular basal cell carcinoma
- List of cutaneous conditions
