= Proliferating epidermoid cyst =

- Other names: 'Proliferating epithelial cyst
- Specialty: Dermatology

Proliferating epidermoid cysts are a cutaneous condition characterized by tumors that have deep invasion, and are associated with anaplasia and a high mitotic rate.

== See also ==
- List of cutaneous conditions
