= Milium =

- Other names: Milia
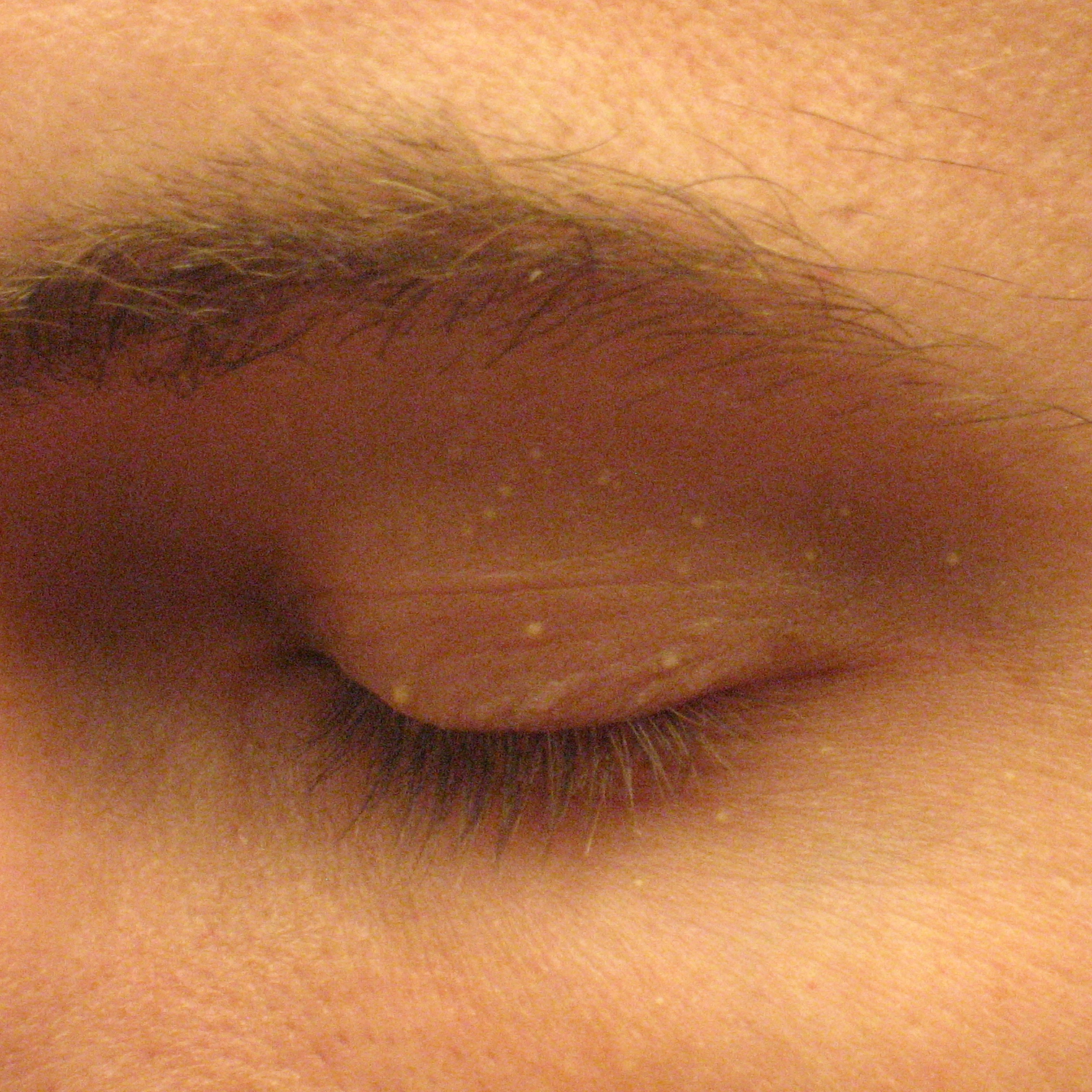
- Milia on the eyelid of an adult
- Specialty: Dermatology

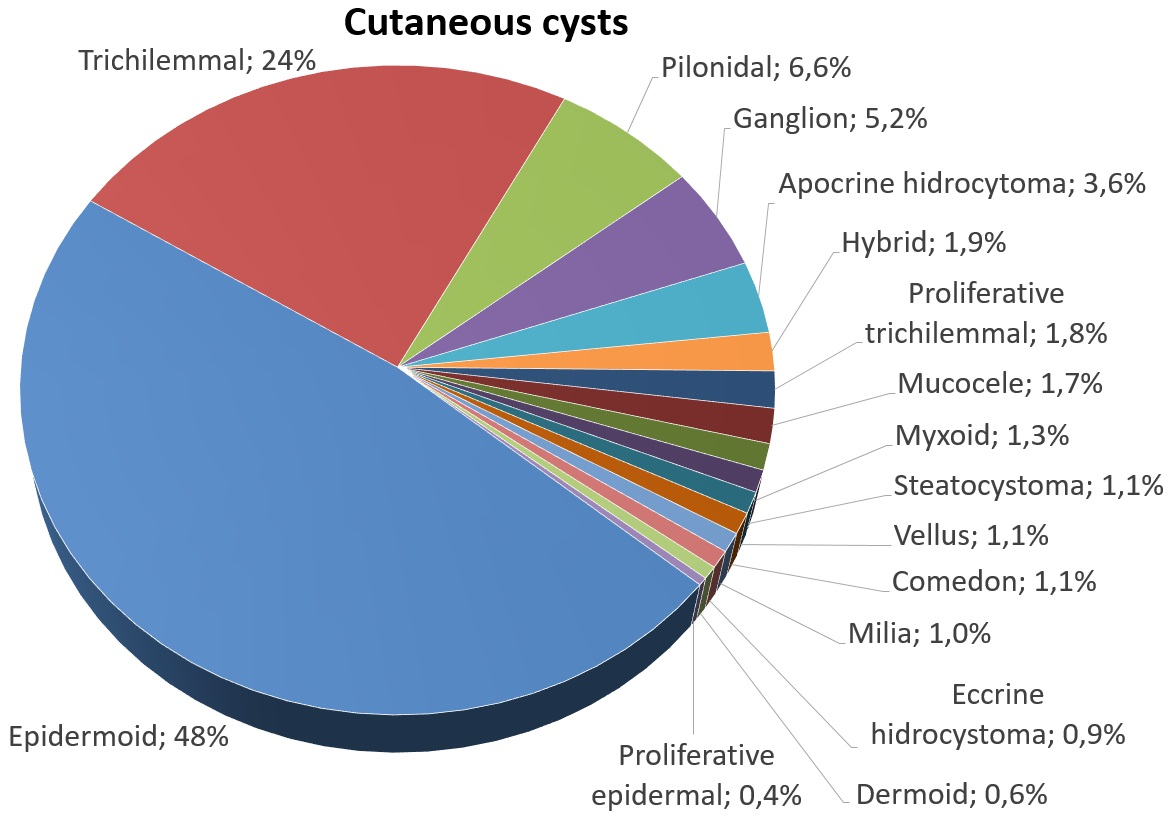
Relative incidence of cutaneous cysts. Milia is labeled at bottom right.

A milium (pl.: milia), also called a milk spot or an oil seed, is a clog of the eccrine sweat gland. It is a keratin-filled cyst that may appear just under the epidermis or on the roof of the mouth. Milia are commonly associated with newborn babies, but may appear on people of any age. They are usually found around the nose and eyes, and sometimes on the genitalia, often mistaken by those affected as warts or other sexually transmitted diseases. Milia can also be confused with stubborn whiteheads.

== Causes ==
The human body gets rid of dead skin cells to make new cells. A milium is made when dead skin cells don't fall off the body and new skin cells grow on top, trapping the dead ones underneath.

Potential causes that lead to development:

- Skin damage from any form of skin trauma
  - Burns, blisters, injuries
- Longterm use of steroids or ointment creams
- Autoimmune conditions- which in rare cases the body mistakenly attacks its own skin cells
- Lifestyle factors, such as poor skincare, consistently using makeup that clogs the pores, lack of sleep
- Other skin conditions (e.g. eczema, rosacea)

== Types ==
There are six different types of milia:

- Neonatal milia- occurs primarily in newborn babies and can be found on the face, torso, and scalp;
- Primary milia- this is the most common form;
- Secondary milia- damage to the skin caused by trauma, disease, or medication (burns, rashes, blisters, sun exposure, or heavy cream/ointment);
- Juvenile milia- seen from birth through childhood;
- Milia en plaque- unusual and seen predominantly in women. Milia appear in clumps or forming a raised patch of skin behind the ears or on the eyelids, cheeks, and jaw;
- Multiple eruptive milia- a rare condition where many milia appear on the face, upper arms, and abdomen over a few weeks or months.

== Treatment ==
In children, milia often disappear within two to four weeks. For adults, they may be removed by a physician (a dermatologist has specialist knowledge in this area). A common method that a dermatologist uses to remove a milium is to nick the skin with a #11 surgical blade and then use a comedone extractor to press the cyst out.

== See also ==
- Eruptive vellus hair cyst
- Sebaceous hyperplasia
- Seborrheic keratosis
