= Steatocystoma multiplex =

- Other names: Epidermal polycystic disease and Sebocystomatosis
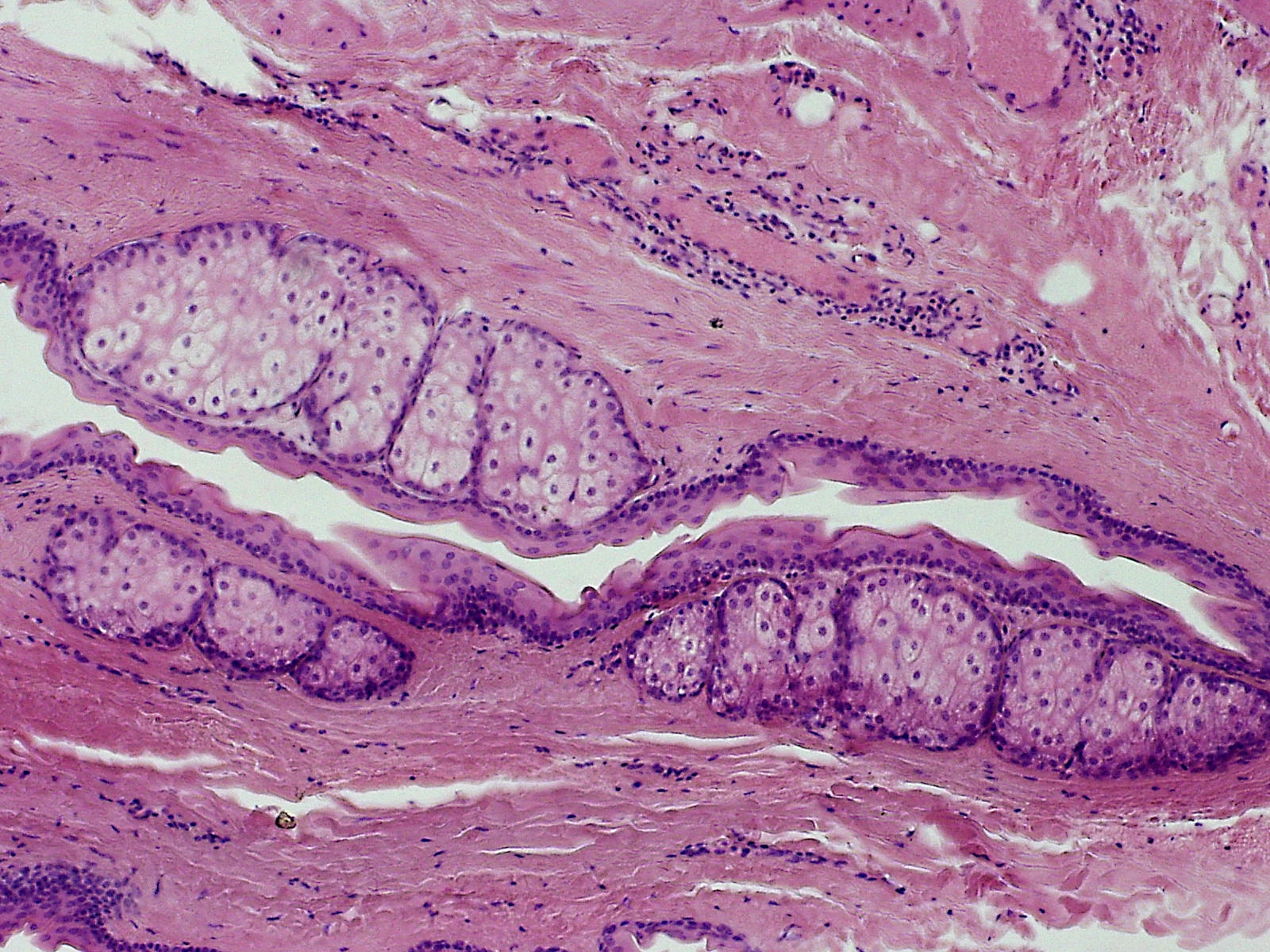
- Specialty: Dermatology

Steatocystoma multiplex is a benign, autosomal dominant congenital condition resulting in multiple cysts on a person's body. Steatocystoma simplex is the solitary counterpart to steatocystoma multiplex. In steatocystoma multiplex, the tendency to develop cysts is inherited in an autosomal dominant fashion, so one parent can be expected to also have steatocystoma multiplex. It may also occur sporadically. Both males and females may be affected.

Its typical onset at puberty is presumably due to the hormonal stimulation of the pilosebaceous unit. Cysts most often arise on the chest and may also occur on the abdomen, upper arms, armpits, and face. In some cases, cysts may develop throughout the body.

The cysts are mostly small (2–20 mm), but they may be several centimetres in diameter. They tend to be soft-to-firm, semi-translucent bumps and contain an oily, yellow liquid. Sometimes a small central punctum can be identified, and they may contain one or more hairs (eruptive vellus hair cysts). They may become inflamed and heal with scarring, like acne nodules seen in nodulocystic acne and hidradenitis suppurativa.

When inflamed, they can become incredibly painful and reach sizes of 4–6 cm in diameter. The area around the cyst can become red and painful to the touch, making mobility, sitting, strenuous movement, or everyday activities very difficult and painful.

Steatocystomas are thought to arise from an abnormal lining of the passageway of the oil glands (sebaceous ducts). Localised, generalised, facial, acral, and suppurative types of steatocystoma multiplex have been described.

== Causes ==
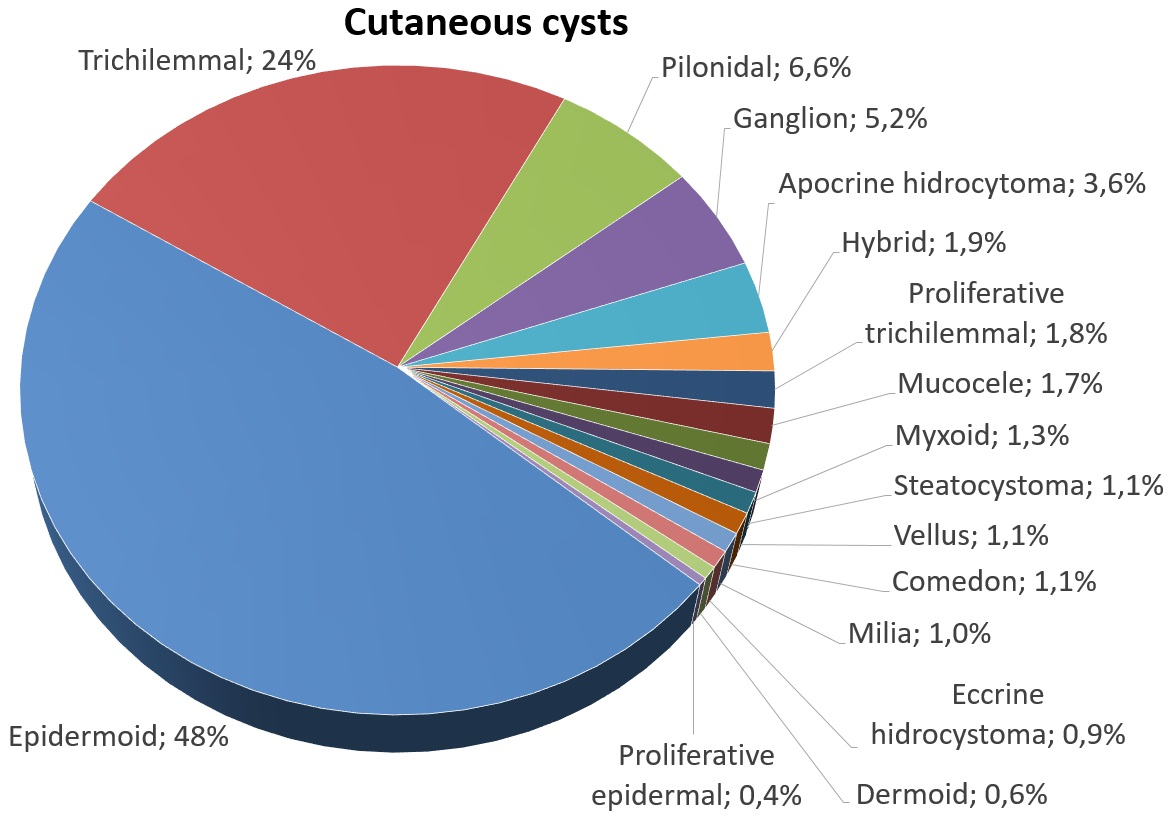
Relative incidence of cutaneous cysts. Steatocystoma is labeled at right.

It is associated with defects in Keratin 17. The condition is inherited in an autosomal dominant manner. This indicates that the defective gene responsible for a disorder is located on an autosome, and only one copy of the defective gene is sufficient to cause the disorder, when inherited from a parent who has the disorder.

However, a solitary case can also emerge in a family with no prior history of the disorder due to the occurrence of a mutation (often referred to as a sporadic or spontaneous mutation).

== Diagnosis ==
It is difficult to diagnose genetic and rare diseases. Healthcare professionals would look at a combination of a patient's medical history, symptoms, physical exam and other laboratory tests to inform their diagnosis.

== Treatment ==
The cysts can be removed via excision, though conventional cyst excision techniques have proven impractical, and a specialized regimen is required.

Cryotherapy and electrodessication may also be tried, but since it is a genetic disorder all the modalities have very little effect.

Individual cysts can be removed surgically. In most cases, small incisions (cuts into the skin) allow the cyst and its contents to be extracted through the opening. If it is tethered to the underlying skin, excision biopsy may be necessary. Cysts can also be removed by laser, electrosurgery or cryotherapy. Inflammation can be reduced with oral antibiotics. Oral isotretinoin is not curative but may temporarily shrink the cysts and reduce inflammation.

== See also ==
- Keratin disease
- Steatocystoma simplex
- List of cutaneous conditions
- List of cutaneous conditions caused by mutations in keratins
