= Steatocystoma simplex =

Simple cyst of the sebaceous ducts in skin

- Other names: Simple sebaceous duct cyst, solitary steatocystoma
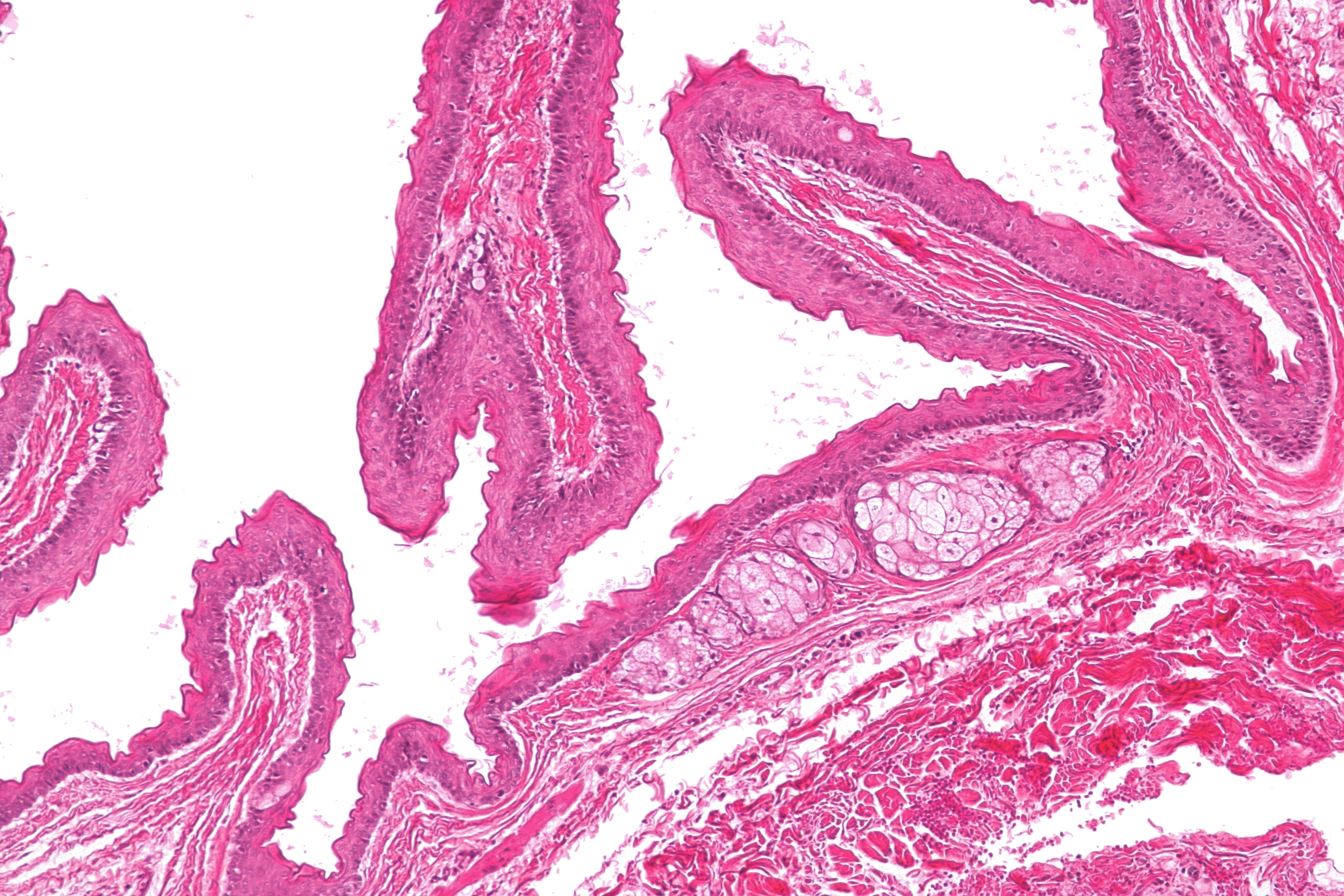
- Micrograph of a steatocystoma showing the characteristic corrugated eosinophilic lining. H&E stain
- Specialty: Dermatology

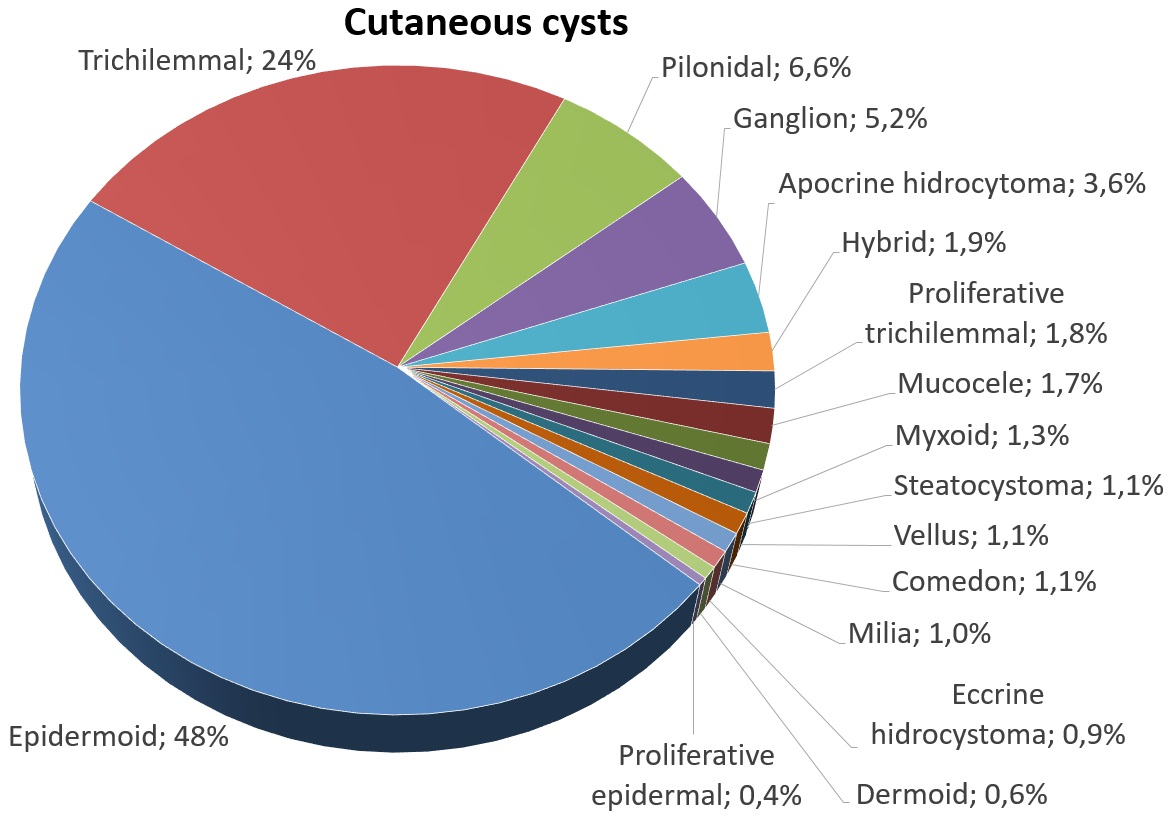
Relative incidence of cutaneous cysts. Steatocystoma is labeled at right.

Steatocystoma simplex is a skin condition characterized by simple cysts forming in the ducts of sebaceous glands of the skin. It may be sporadic or hereditary. It occurs with equal frequency in adult women and men, and cysts are typically found on the face, trunk, or extremities. It is related to Steatocystoma multiplex.
