= Folliculosebaceous-apocrine hamartoma =

- Other names: Follicular-apocrine hamartoma
- Specialty: Dermatology

A folliculosebaceous-apocrine hamartoma, also known as follicular-apocrine hamartoma, is a benign proliferation of the folliculosebaceous-apocrine unit.

== See also ==
- List of cutaneous conditions
