= Chronic undermining burrowing ulcer =

Type of bacterial gangrene

- Other names: Meleney gangrene, or Meleney's ulcer
- Specialty: Dermatology

Chronic undermining burrowing ulcer is a cutaneous condition that is a postoperative, progressive bacterial gangrene.

== See also ==
- Skin lesion
