= Exanthematic pustular psoriasis =

- Specialty: Dermatology

Exanthematic pustular psoriasis is a skin condition characterized by an acute eruption of small pustules, abruptly appearing and disappearing in a few days. It usually follows an infection or may be caused by medications.

== See also ==
- Psoriasis
- List of cutaneous conditions
