= Iron metallic discoloration =

- Specialty: Dermatology

Iron metallic discoloration occurred more frequently in the past when soluble iron compounds were used in the treatment of allergic contact and other dermatitis, and in eroded areas iron was sometimes deposited in the skin, like a tattoo.

== See also ==
- Skin lesion
