= Pseudoverrucous papules and nodules =

- Specialty: Dermatology

Pseudoverrucous papules and nodules are a skin condition characterized by striking 2– to 8–mm, shiny, smooth, red, moist, flat-topped, round skin lesions in the perianal area of children.

== See also ==
- Skin lesion
