= Blistering distal dactylitis =

- Specialty: Dermatology

Blistering distal dactylitis is a cutaneous condition characterized by tense superficial bullae occurring on a tender erythematous base over the volar fat pad of the phalanx of a finger or thumb.

== See also ==
- List of cutaneous conditions
