= HIV-associated pruritus =

- Specialty: Dermatology

HIV-associated pruritus is a cutaneous condition, an itchiness of the skin, that occurs in up to 30% of HIV infected people, occurs when the T-cell count drops below 400 per cubic mm.

== See also ==
- Skin lesion
