= Urticarial allergic eruption =

- Specialty: Dermatology

Urticarial allergic eruption is a cutaneous condition characterized by annular or gyrate urticarial plaques that persist for greater than 24 hours.

== See also ==
- Urticaria
- List of cutaneous conditions
