= Narcotic dermopathy =

- Specialty: Dermatology

Narcotic dermopathy is a skin condition caused by the injection of drugs intravenously, resulting in thrombosed, cordlike, thickened veins at the site of injection.

== See also ==
- Skin lesion
