= Cutaneous Pasteurella hemolytica infection =

- Specialty: Infectious diseases

Cutaneous Pasteurella hemolytica infections may occur in patients with skin injury and exposure Pasteurella hemolytica.

== See also ==
- Skin lesion
