= Borderline lepromatous leprosy =

- Specialty: Infectious diseases

Borderline lepromatous leprosy is a skin condition with numerous, symmetrical skin lesions.

== See also ==
- Leprosy
- Cutaneous conditions
