= Interstitial granulomatous drug reaction =

- Specialty: Dermatology

Interstitial granulomatous drug reaction is an uncommon, yet under-recognized, pattern of adverse reactions to medication.

== See also ==
- Skin lesion
