= Pigmented wart =

- Specialty: Dermatology

Pigmented warts are a cutaneous condition commonly reported in Japan, most often occurring on the hands or feet.

== See also ==
- Skin lesion
- List of cutaneous conditions
