= Coral dermatitis =

- Specialty: Dermatology

Coral dermatitis is a cutaneous condition caused by injury from the exoskeleton of certain corals.

== See also ==
- Skin lesion
