= Thermal keratosis =

- Specialty: Dermatology

Thermal keratoses are keratotic skin lesions produced in the skin by exposure to infrared radiation.
