= John James Pringle =

Scottish dermatologist (1855–1922)

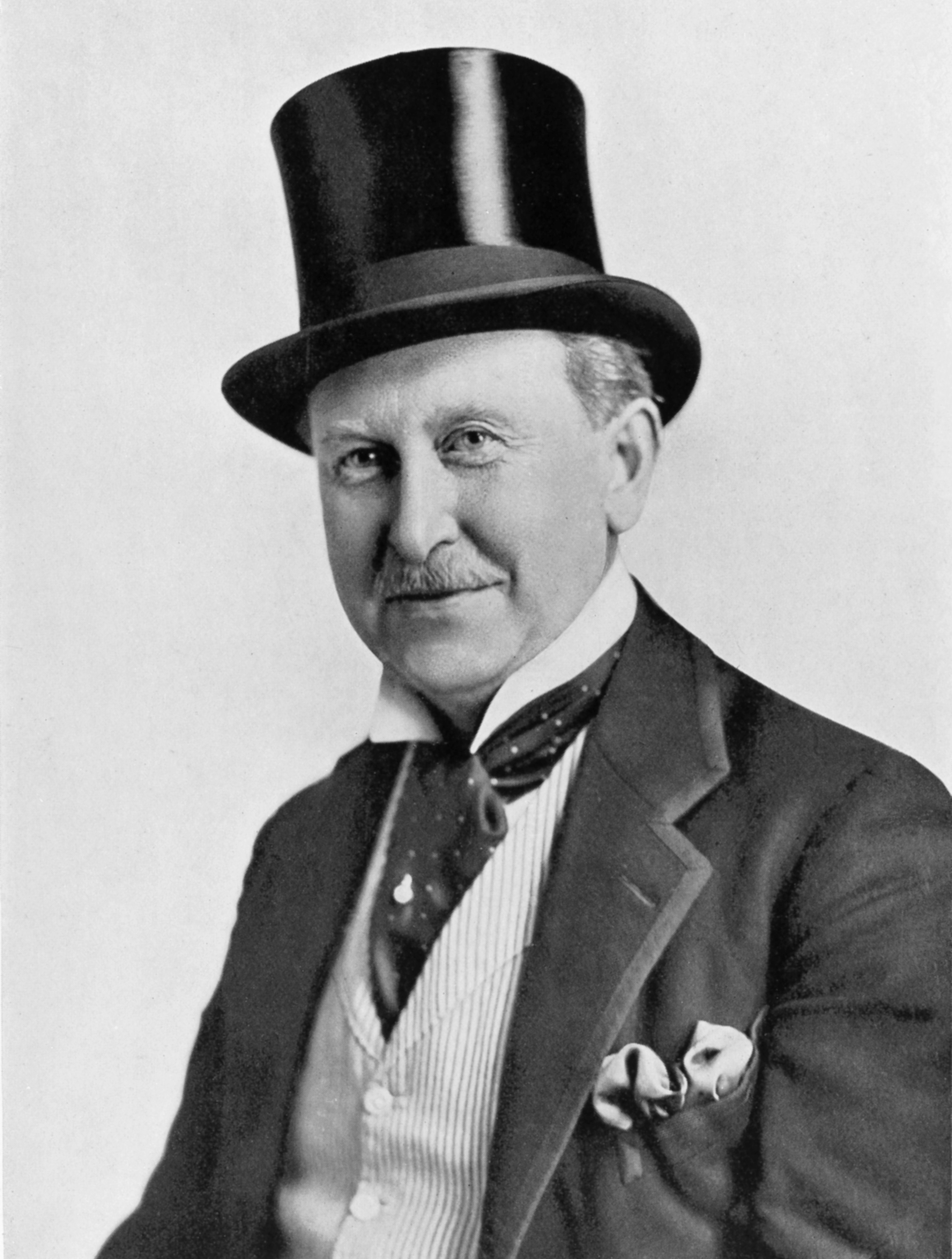
John James Pringle

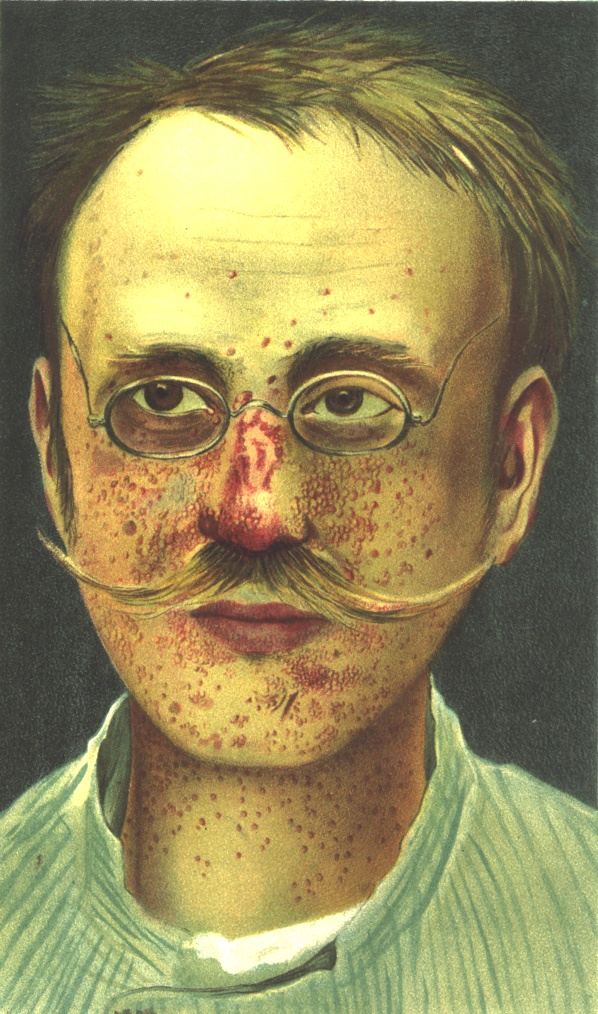
A man with adenoma sebaceum, 1903.

John James Pringle (1855 – 18 December 1922) was a Scottish dermatologist.

== Biography ==
Pringle was born in Borgue, Kirkcudbrightshire and educated at Merchiston Castle School. He graduated in medicine from the University of Edinburgh in 1876. He then travelled abroad, studying in Dublin, Vienna, Paris and Berlin. He studying dermatology in Vienna under Ferdinand von Hebra and Moriz Kaposi, and in Paris under Jean Baptiste Emile Vidal and Jean Alfred Fournier.

He settled in London in 1882. From 1888 to 1920, he worked as a dermatologist at the Middlesex Hospital in London. He caught tuberculosis and spent six months of 1903 in a sanatorium. He never fully recovered and, whilst on a trip intended to improve his health, he died at Christchurch, New Zealand. He is related to Sir John Pringle.

== Adenoma sebaceum ==
JJ Pringle is primarily remembered for the eponym: Pringle's Adenoma Sebaceum. Now known as facial angiofibroma, this papular facial rash, of distinctive butterfly distribution, was first described in English by Pringle. In 1890 he reported in detail the case of a 25-year-old woman, who was not "particularly bright intellectually" and had presented with both skin and digestive complaints. He described the papules in detail, noting the capillary involvement and their fibrous nature. He believed that the sebaceous glands were the source of the problem. Pringle was unfamiliar with the condition so presented his patient to a meeting of the Dermatological Society in 1889-01-09. Two visitors recognized a similarity with models in the Museum of the Saint Louis Hospital in Paris. This led Pringle to become acquainted with five other cases, two previously published, that he includes in his report.

Pringle adopted the term "adenoma sebaceum" from Félix Balzer's phrase "adénomes sébacés". The papules were in fact neither adenoma nor derived from sebaceous glands. Pringle dismisses one report of a hereditary aspect as "dubious". The patients are generally reluctant to submit to treatment, which leads to considerable bleeding and pain.

Several years later, physicians would recognize that the combination of adenoma sebaceum, epilepsy and learning disability was diagnostic for tuberous sclerosis. The three signs are known as Vogt's triad. Although Pringle's report does not mention epilepsy, most of the patients are of limited intelligence, and these cases are regarded as early accounts of tuberous sclerosis.

== Achievements ==
- 1891–1895, editor of the British Journal of Dermatology.
- 1895–1901, secretary of the Dermatological Society.
- 1896, appointed Secretary General to the International Congress of Dermatology.
- President of the dermatology section of the Royal Society of Medicine

== Publications ==
- Pringle, JJ (1890). "A case of congenital adenoma sebaceum". British Journal of Dermatology. 2: 1–14.
- Pringle, JJ (1891). "Angiokeratoma". British Journal of Dermatology. 3: 237–244, 282–285, 309–317.

== See also ==
- Timeline of tuberous sclerosis
