= Manuel Rodríguez Gómez =

Spanish-born American neurologist

Manuel Gomez
- Born: 4 July 1928; Minaya, Spain
- Died: 21 January 2006 (aged 77)
- Spouse: Joan Stormer (m. 1954)
- Children: 4 sons

Manuel Rodríguez Gómez (July 4, 1928 – January 21, 2006) was a Spanish-born American neurologist most noted for his work on tuberous sclerosis, a rare genetic disorder.

== Life ==
Manuel Gómez was born in the Spanish city of Minaya in La Mancha, Spain. He spent his childhood outside Sevilla in a town called Alcala de Guadaira, where his father had a pharmacy, and summers in Cadiz. As a child he recalled seeing the great flamenco singer, Bernardo, El de los Lobitos, walking on the street. He attended boarding school with his brother and was schooled by a group of strict priests. Recently the mayor of Alcala renamed a street Calle Manuel Rodriguez Gomez. He lived through the Spanish Civil War and recalled at least one near miss when he and his older brother were rescued from hiding under a bridge by an old man when they heard the sound of a German dive bomber. After running away and hearing the explosion they looked up to see that the bridge that had been the target was demolished. As his father had supported the Republic he felt insecure after Franco won the war. Thus when he was 12 years old, his family took the opportunity to move to Cuba. He studied violin as a young man, and while he had a great interest in a musical career or in studying mathematics, he entered medical school at the age of 18, and was regularly near the top of his class. After one difficult medical school exam he and his friends got carried away by the celebration and shouted protests against the dictator Batista. He and his friends spent the evening in jail, although all were released unharmed by morning. He received his doctorate in medicine at the Universidad de la Habana in 1952. After graduation he secured an internship in Michael Reese Hospital in Chicago, leaving his parents and siblings in Havana.

He met Joan A. Stormer while working at Michael Reese and married her in 1954. His four sons have pursued academic and medical careers; one is a neurologist, one a developmental neurobiologist, one is a wildlife biologist, and one is a professor of art. He had seven grandchildren.

== Career ==
- 1952: Doctorate in medicine from the Universidad de la Habana, Cuba.
- 1952–1953: Internship at Michael Reese Hospital, Chicago.
- 1953–1954: Residency in pediatrics at the University of Michigan.
- 1954–1956: Residency in neurology at the University of Michigan, where he received an MS degree in neuroanatomy.
- 1956–1957: Fellow in pediatric neurology at University of Chicago.
- 1957–1958: Faculty of neurology at the State University of New York at Buffalo.
- 1958–1959: Studied at the Institute of Neurology, Queen Square, London.
- 1960–1964: Associate professor of neurology at the Wayne State University School of Medicine, Detroit. Certified in neurology by the ABPN.
- 1964–1984: Head of the department of Pediatric Neurology at Mayo Clinic, Rochester. He became Professor of Pediatric Neurology in 1974 and Professor Emeritus in 1994.
- 2000: Retired.

== Organisations ==
Manuel Gómez was a charter member of the American Child Neurology Society, the International Child Neurology Association (ICNA) and the Latin American Academy of Pediatric Neurology. He was honorary member of a number of pediatric and neurology societies, including the Sociedad Española de Neurología (SEN) and Sociedad Española de Neurología Pediátrica (SENP).

== Awards ==
- The Santiago Ramón y Cajal Award from The Iberoamerican Academy of Pediatric Neurology in 1995.
- The Hower Award from the Child Neurology Society.
- The Tuberous Sclerosis Alliance established in 1995 the Manuel R. Gomez Professional Recognition Award in his honor. This award is for "creative or pioneering efforts that have appreciably improved either the understanding of the disease or the clinical care available for individuals with tuberous sclerosis."

== Tuberous sclerosis ==
Manuel Gómez was most interested in neurocutaneous syndromes, and especially tuberous sclerosis. In 1967 he broke the established wisdom that tuberous sclerosis was defined by Vogt's triad of mental retardation, epilepsy and adenoma sebaceum (a papular facial rash). He co-published a paper showing that about a third of patients had normal intelligence. In 1979, he edited the monograph Tuberous Sclerosis Complex, the first and, for over twenty years, the only textbook on the disease. In it, he established a comprehensive diagnostic criteria for tuberous sclerosis. This book has been translated into Spanish and has been revised twice: in 1988 and 1999.

== Publications ==
- Manuel R. Gomez, ed. (1987). Neurocutaneous diseases. London: Butterworths. ISBN 0-409-90018-4.
- Manuel Rodríguez Gómez (ed); Julian R. Sampson, Vicky Holets Whittemore (ass. eds) (1999). Tuberous sclerosis complex 3rd ed. Oxford: Oxford University Press. ISBN 0-19-512210-0.
- William G. Johnson, Manuel Rodríguez Gomez (eds); Tuberous Sclerosis and Allied Disorders: Clinical, Cellular, and Molecular Studies (Annals of the New York Academy of Sciences, Vol 615). (1991). Tuberous Sclerosis and Allied Disorders: Clinical, Cellular, and Molecular Studies. New York: New York Academy of Sciences. ISBN 978-0-8976-6655-8.

Manuel Gómez was the author of more than 170 scientific papers including 93 peer-reviewed articles.

== See also ==
- Timeline of tuberous sclerosis
