= Désiré-Magloire Bourneville =

French neurologist (1840–1909)

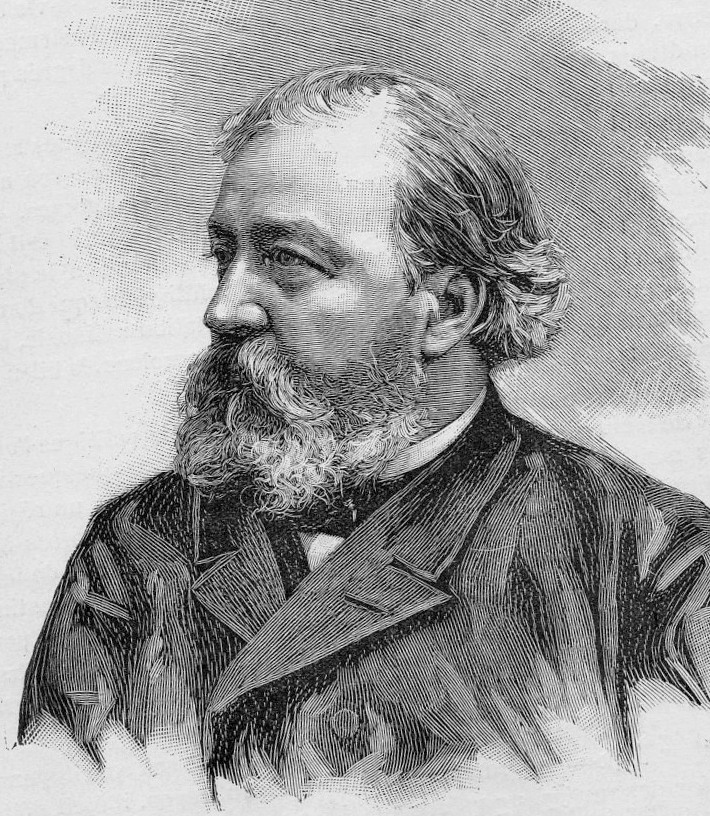
Désiré-Magloire Bourneville

Désiré-Magloire Bourneville (English: /bɔːrnˈviːl/) (20 October 1840 – 28 May 1909) was a French neurologist born in Garencières.

== Career ==
He studied medicine in Paris, and worked as interne des hôpitaux at the Salpêtrière, Bicêtre, Hôpital Saint-Louis and the Pitié. During the Franco-Prussian War, he served as both a surgeon and an assistant medical officer. From 1879 to 1905 he was a physician of pediatric services at Bicêtre. In Paris, he founded a day school for special instruction of children with mental disability.

In 1866, during a severe cholera epidemic in Amiens, he volunteered his services, and after the siege had passed, was presented with a gold watch as an expression of the city's gratitude. During the Paris Commune (1871), when revolutionaries wanted to execute their wounded enemies, Bourneville intervened and saved the prisoners' lives.

He was elected to the Paris city council in 1876 and to the French Parliament in 1883, where he served as a deputy until 1889. In both positions he advocated reforms of the health system. As a politician, he spearheaded efforts to train professional, secular nurses to replace the religious sisters who staffed most of the nation's hospitals at the time.

In 1880, he provided an early description of a multi-symptom disorder that was to become known as "Bourneville's syndrome", now known as tuberous sclerosis. This genetic condition may lead to intellectual disability, epilepsy, a disfiguring facial rash and benign tumors in the brain, heart, kidney and other organs. The condition was also studied by the British dermatologist, John James Pringle (1855–1922), leading some historical texts to refer to it as "Bourneville-Pringle disease".

Bourneville published works which stated that saints claiming to produce miracles or stigmata, and those claiming to be possessed were actually suffering from epilepsy or hysteria.

Bourneville was skeptical of mystical and supernatural claims. Between 1882 and 1902, he published a series of volumes known as La Bibliothèque Diabolique, in these he re-evaluated historical cases of possession and witchcraft in favor for pathological explanations.

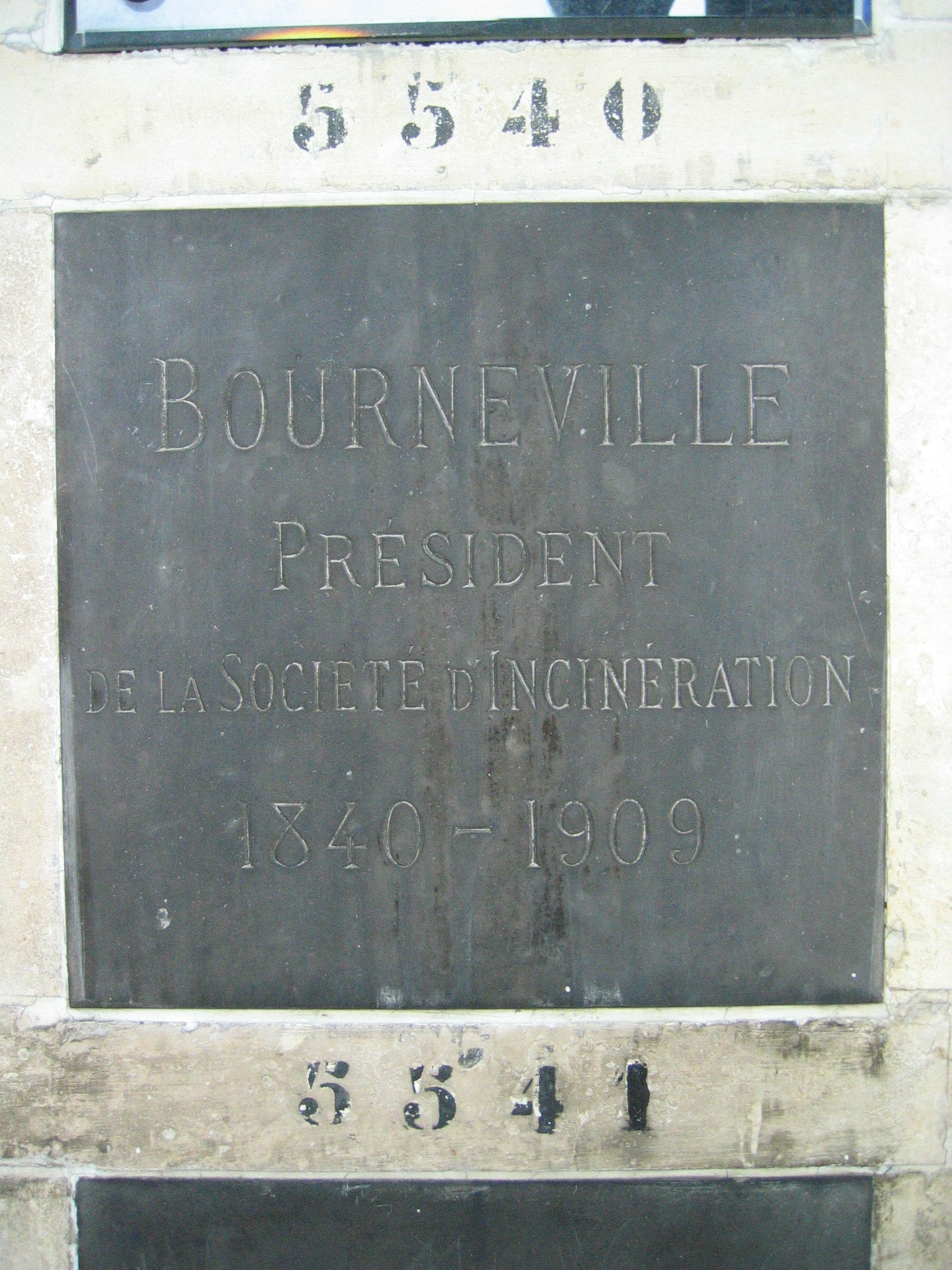
Bourneville's niche in the columbarium of Pere Lachaise

== Writings ==
- De la sclérose en plaques disséminées (1869)
- Études du thermométrie clinique dans l'hémorrhagie cérébrale (1872)
- Science et miracle: Louise Lateau, ou la stigmatisée belge (1878)
- Sclérose tubéreuse des circonvolution cérébrales: Idiotie et épilepsie hemiplégique. Archives de neurologie, Paris, 1880, 1: 81–91.
- Encéphalite ou sclérose tubéreuse des circonvolutions cérébrales. Archives de neurologie, Paris, 1881, 1: 390–412.
- Iconographie photographique de la Salpêtrière. Service de Jean Charcot. (with Paul-Marie-Léon Regnard 1850–1927). three volumes, Paris 1876–1880.
- Assistance, traitement et éducation des enfants idiots et dégénérés. Paris, 1895.
- Le Sabbat des Sorciers, with E. Teinturier (1882)

== See also ==
- A Clinical Lesson at the Salpêtrière – 1887 group tableau portrait by André Brouillet
- Timeline of tuberous sclerosis
