= Alfred Vogt =

Swiss ophthalmologist (1879-1943)

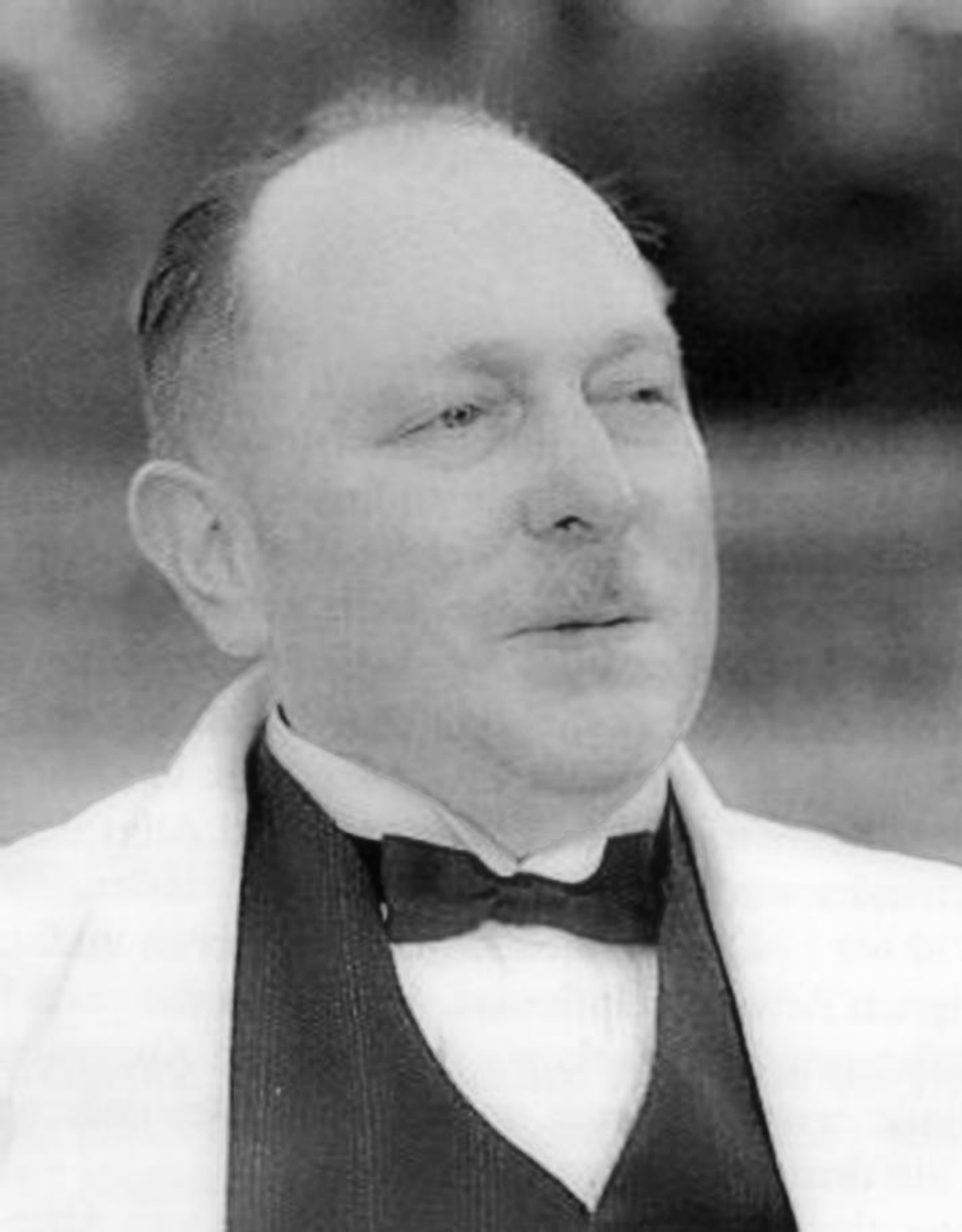
- Alfred Vogt
- Born: 31 October 1879; Menziken, Aargau
- Died: 10 December 1943 (aged 64); Zürich
- Education: University of Basel
- Awards: Gonin Medal (1941)
- Scientific career
- Fields: ophthalmologist

Alfred Vogt (31 October 1879 – 10 December 1943) was a Swiss ophthalmologist, known for his development of techniques for retinoscopy and the surgical management of retinal detachment.

Alfred Vogt received his doctorate from the University of Basel in 1904. After training in ophthalmology under professor Karl Mellinger in Basel, Vogt started private practice in 1906. In 1909 he was appointed head physician of the ophthalmological department of the cantonal hospital in the city of Aarau. In 1917 he was appointed professor extraordinarius and director of the University of Basel's eye clinic. In 1923 he was appointed professor ordinarius and director of the University of Zurich's eye clinic.

Vogt was a pioneer of specular microscopy; around 1913 he used a slit lamp together with a corneal microscope to investigate the structures of the anterior areas of the eye, and in 1918 he was the first to perform direct examination of the corneal endothelium. He is also credited with introducing perforating cyclodiathermy for the treatment of glaucoma (in 1936).

== Early life and education ==
Vogt was born 31 October 1879 in Burg near Menziken, to Jakob Vogt, a primary school teacher, and Elise (née Koch) into a Protestant family. He completed his studies at the University of Zürich and the University of Basel.

== Personal life ==
In 1906, Vogt married Marie Bossart (1879–1965), of Oberägeri. They had two daughters;

- Helene Vogt (1909–1984), married to Arthur Wiederkehr (born 1910), an attorney who served on several notable boards (AIAG Alusuisse, Motor-Columbus and UBS). They had two sons and two daughters. Her sons were notable attorneys Dr. Alfred J. Wiederkehr (1936–2023) and Dr. Georg R. Wiederkehr (1938–2017).
- Johanna "Hanni" Vogt (1913–1990), married to Dr. Peter Müller (1909–1981) of Bern. They had three sons and one daughter.

Vogt died on 10 December 1943 in Zürich, Switzerland aged 64.

== Awards and honors ==
- 1919 Election to the Leopoldina
- 1932 Donders Medal of the Dutch Ophthalmological Society
- 1939 Cothenius Medal of the Leopoldina
- 1941 Gonin Medal
- 1942 Gullstrand Medal of the Swedish Medical Society

== Selected works ==
- Damage to the Eye caused by Aniline Dye.
- Atlas der Spaltlampenmikroskopie des lebenden Auges. Berlin, J. Springer, 1921.
  - 2nd edition in 2 volumes. Springer, 1930–1931
  - 3rd volume. F. Enke, 1942.
    - English translation Handbook and Atlas of the Slit Lamp Microscopy of the Living Eye in 3 volumes, Zürich, 1947.
  - New printing of the 2nd edition (in German), Bonn, J. P. Wayenborgh, 1977.
    - English translation Textbook and Atlas of the Slit Lamp Microscopy of the Living Eye by F. C. Blodi, 3 volumes, Bonn, J. P. Wayenborgh, 1978–1981
    - French translation, Italian translation.

== Eponyms ==
- Anterior crocodile shagreen of Vogt
- Palisades of Vogt
- Striae of Vogt
- Vogt–Koyanagi–Harada disease
- Vogt's triad: seen in glaucoma, shouldn't be confused with "Vogt's triad" seen in tuberous sclerosis which is named after the German neurologist Heinrich Vogt.
