= Subependymal zone =

The subependymal zone (SEZ) is a cell layer below the ependyma in the lateral ventricles of the brain. It is an adult version of the embryonic forebrain germinal zone. This region contains adult neural stem cells also called neuroepithelial cells which have the potential to generate new neurons and glial cells. The generation of neurons and glial cells from neuroepithelial cells occurs via neurogenesis and gliogenesis, respectively. In adults, the subependymal zone is also called the subventricular zone as the ependymal cell layer forms the boundary between the fluid-filled ventricular space and the walls of the lateral ventricles.

Ilias Kazanis at the University of Cambridge compares the subependymal zone to a beating heart which "continuously sends new cells to different areas of the brain neurons to the olfactory bulbs and glial cells to the cortex and the corpus callosum."

The subependymal zone is a region that may be affected by subependymal giant cell astrocytomas in people with tuberous sclerosis.
