= Heinrich Vogt =

Heinrich Vogt may refer to:

- Heinrich Vogt (neurologist)
- Heinrich Vogt (astronomer)
