= Félix Balzer =

French physician (1849–1929)

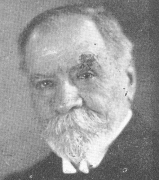
- Born: April 4, 1849
- Died: March 15, 1929 (aged 79)
- Occupation: Physician

Félix Balzer (4 April 1849 – 15 March 1929) was a French physician, specialising in dermatology and pathology.

Balzer gave an early description of pseudoxanthoma elasticum in 1884. He used the term "xanthome elastique" but subsequently it was found not to be a form of xanthomatosis. Balzer is also responsible for coining the term "adénomes sébacés" (adenoma sebaceum) to describe the papular facial rash of tuberous sclerosis. Again, this term proved to be incorrect since the papules were neither adenoma nor derived from sebaceous glands.

Between 1880 and 1887, Balzer was a director of the histology laboratory in the Faculty of the hospital Saint Louis. He became a member of the Académie de Médecine in 1908. He was also president of la Société Française de Dermatologie.

== Papers ==
- Balzer F (1884). "Recherches sur les charactères anatomiques du xanthélasma". Archives de Physiologie Normale et Pathologique. 4 (3). Paris: 65–80.
- Balzer F, Dubreuilh W (1884). "Observations et recherches sur l'érythrasma et sur les parasites de la peau à l'état normal". Ann. Derm. Syph. 5. Paris: 598–606, 661–666.
- Balzer F, Ménétrier P (1885). "Étude sur un cas d'adénomes sébacés de la face et du cuir". Archives de Physiologie Normale et Pathologique. 6 (3). Paris: 564–76.
- Balzer F, Grandhomme (1886). "Nouveau cas d'adénomes sébacés de la facea". Archives de Physiologie Normale et Pathologique. 8. Paris: 93–96.
- Balzer F (1906). Maladies vénériennes. Nouveau traité de médecine et de thérapeutique. Paris: J.-B. Baillière et Fils. pp. 469–501.

== See also ==
- Timeline of tuberous sclerosis
