= Paul Regnard =

Paul-Marie-Léon Regnard
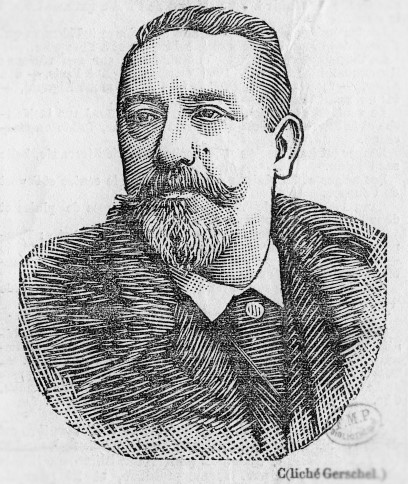
- Paul-Marie-Léon Regnard
- Born: November 7, 1850; Châtillon-sur-Seine
- Died: April 18, 1927 (aged 76); Paris

Paul-Marie-Léon Regnard (7 November 1850 – 18 April 1927) was a French physician, physiologist and photographer. He was one of the first naturalists to study the effects of atmospheric pressure on microbial metabolism.

In 1878 he received his medical doctorate, and was later appointed director of the Institut national agronomique (1902).

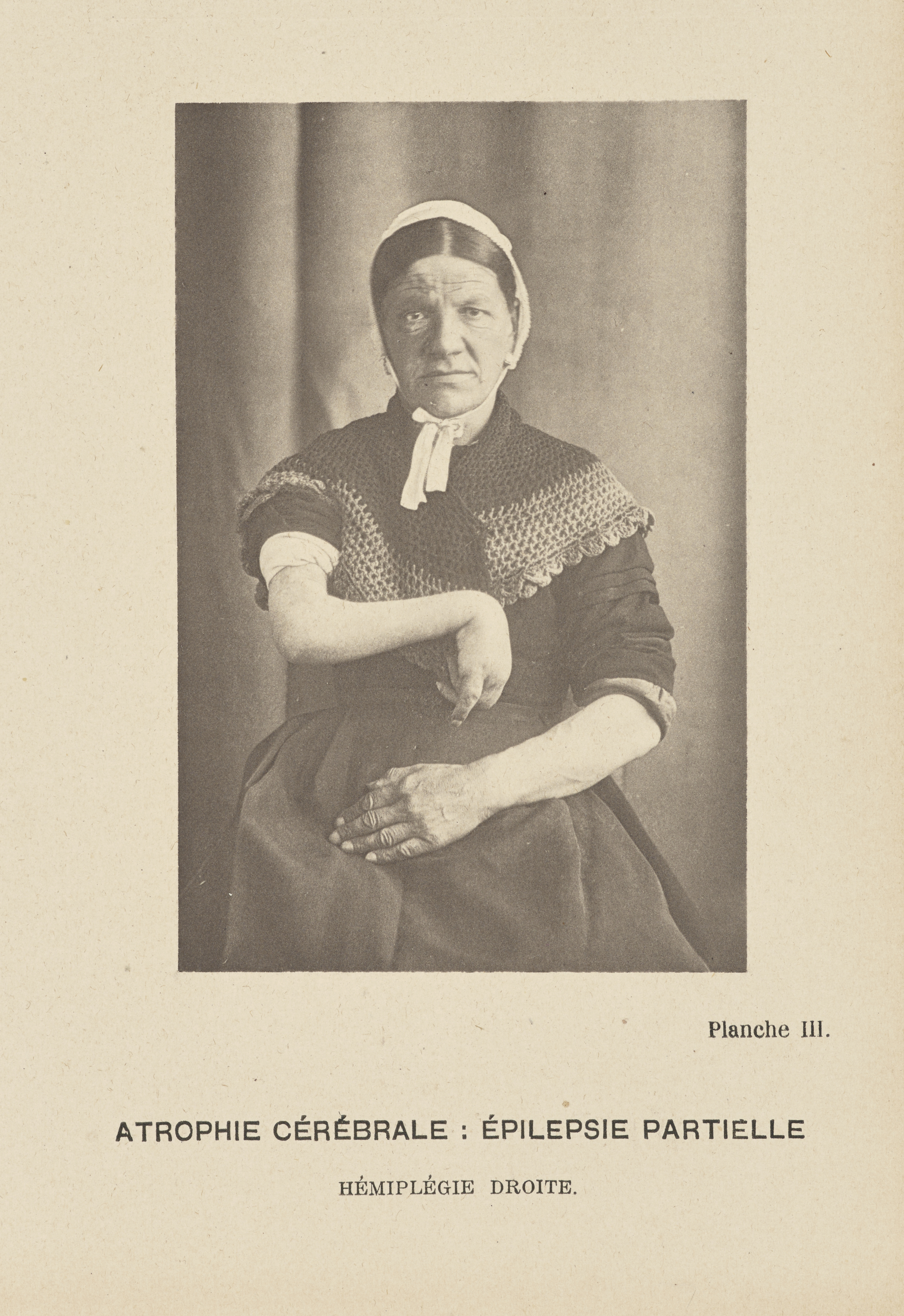
Cerebral Atrophy: Partial Epilepsy Right Hemiplegia, 1878 photography by Regnard.

Regnard, an early practitioner of medical photography, is also known for the photographs he took of the mentally ill at La Salpêtrière hospital in Paris, published in the book Iconographie photographique de la Salpêtrière. Service de M. Charcot.

== Publications ==
- De l'Ischurie hystérique (with Désiré-Magloire Bourneville) Paris : A. Delahaye, 1876 – On hysterical ischuria.
- Iconographie photographique de la Salpêtrière : service de M. Charcot (with Désiré-Magloire Bourneville) Paris : Aux bureaux du Progrès médical, 1876-1880 – Photographic iconography at the Salpêtrière.
- Recherches expérimentales sur les variations pathologiques des combustions respiratoires, 1878 – Experimental research on pathological changes of respiratory combustions.
- Les maladies épidémiques de l'esprit : sorcellerie, magnétisme, morphinisme, délire des grandeurs : Ouvrage illustré de cent vingt gravures, Paris : E. Plon, Nourrit et cie, 1887 – Epidemic maladies of the spirit, sorcery, magnetism, morphine addiction, delusions of grandeur.
- Physique biologique. Recherches expêrimentales sur les conditions physiques de la vie dans les eaux, 1891 – Biological physics. Experimental research on physical conditions of life in the water.
- Hygiène de la ferme (with Paul Portier) Paris : J.-B. Baillière et fils, 1906 – Hygiene on the farm.

== Collections ==
His photographic work is included in the permanent collections of the Museum of Fine Arts Houston, the San Francisco Museum of Modern Art, the Wellcome Collection and the Getty Museum.
