= Alfred Walter Campbell =

Australian neurologist

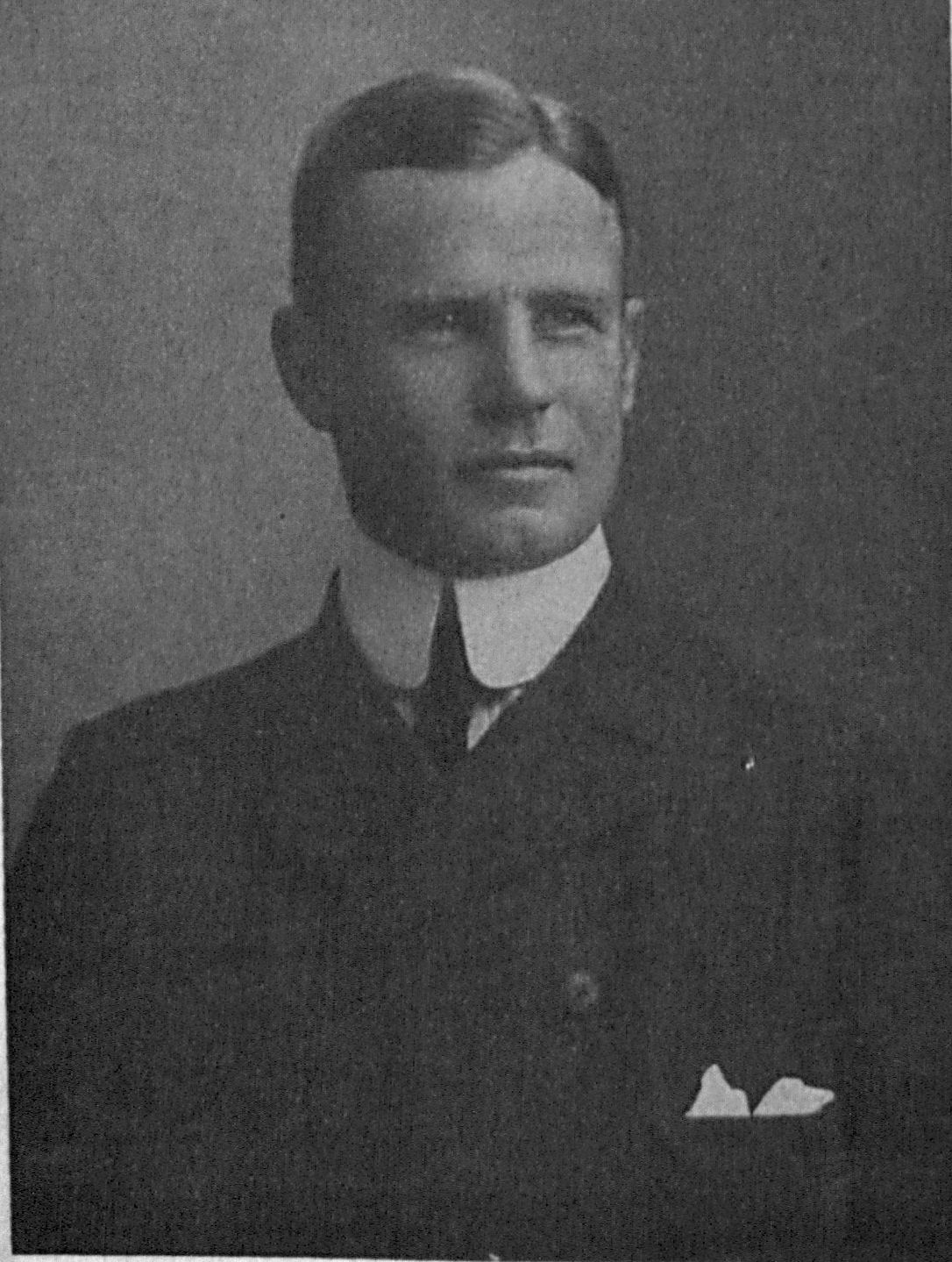
- Alfred Walter Campbell
- Born: 18 January 1868; Harden, New South Wales
- Died: 11 April 1937 (aged 69); Rose Bay, New South Wales
- Education: University of Edinburgh
- Scientific career
- Fields: neurologist

Alfred Walter Campbell (18 January 1868 – 4 November 1937) was regarded as Australia's first neurologist.

== Early life and education ==
Campbell was born at Cunningham Plains, near Harden, New South Wales. At age 18, he enrolled at the University of Edinburgh to study medicine, graduating four years later in 1889. Campbell worked in London, Vienna and Prague, developing his neurological speciality. He became fluent in French, German and Italian. In 1892, Campbell was awarded a doctorate by the University of Edinburgh for his thesis The Pathology of Alcoholic Insanity.

== Career ==
Campbell's longest post in the UK was the thirteen years he spent working at Rainhill Asylum, Liverpool. He was Resident Medical Officer and Directory of the Pathology Laboratory. During his time there, Campbell and the laboratory became internationally known, leading to visitors from all parts of the world.

At the age of 37, in 1905, he returned to Australia and lived in Sydney. His focus shifted from neuroanatomy and neuropathology to working clinically as a neurologist. Shortly after his return, Campbell married a childhood friend, Jenny Mackay, with whom he had two daughters. He became a member of the Royal Society of New South Wales in 1907.

Campbell enlisted in the Australian Imperial Force and served as Major in the army in Egypt during the First World War. On his return, he studied the "Australian disease", which later became known as Murray Valley encephalitis. He died, of cancer, in his home at Rose Bay, New South Wales in 1937.

== Papers ==
- "Degenerations consequent on experimental lesions of the cerebellum". British Medical Journal. 2: 641–642. 1894.
- "A Contribution to the Morbid Anatomy and Pathology of the Neuro-muscular Changes in General Paresis of the Insane". Journal of Mental Science. 40 (169): 177–195. 1894. doi:10.1192/bjp.40.169.177.
- "On vacuolation of the nerve cell of the human cerebral cortex". Journal of Pathology and Bacteriology. 2 (3): 380–393. 1894. doi:10.1002/path.1700020308.
- Histological Studies on the Localisation of Cerebral Function. Cambridge University Press. 1905.
- "Cerebral sclerosis". Brain. 28 (3–4): 367–437. 1906. doi:10.1093/brain/28.3-4.367. Zenodo: 1431625.

== See also ==
- Timeline of tuberous sclerosis
