= Ann Mercy Hunt =

(1938–2014), medical researcher and campaigner

- Born: 25 October 1938; Welshpool, Wales
- Died: 25 June 2014 (aged 75)
- Education: Cambridge University
- Occupation: Campaigner
- Spouse: John

Ann Mercy Hunt MBE (25 October 1938 – 25 June 2014) was a British medical researcher and campaigner. She co-founded the Tuberous Sclerosis Association and became a researcher into the tuberous sclerosis complex. Her youngest son died from the condition aged 13. In 1997 the TSC2 gene was identified by a European consortium supported by her organisation.

== Life ==
Hunt was born in Welshpool in 1938. Hunt went to City of London School for Girls before taking Chemistry at Cambridge University. She married John Hunt as they both worked in research in America and in the UK, where she learnt about research techniques. John became an academic in Oxford.

She had a son who suffered from Tuberous Sclerosis and she was surprised to find that there was so little information or research into the condition. Her youngest son died from the condition aged 13.

She founded the Tuberous Sclerosis Association in 1977. Ann got involved with the research required and worked on a database of the behavioural and physical aspects of the disease. She used these to publish academic papers on the condition and in 1993 she became the TSA's research director. She was credited with making the research happen. In 1997 the TSC2 gene was identified by a European consortium supported by her organisation. The gene's identification enabled a test to be created and the development of drugs that can be used to treat the condition.

In 2002 she received an MBE for her work with the Tuberous Sclerosis Association. Her husband, John, died in 2012 and she died in 2014.
