= Minaya =

- Municipality
- Coat of arms

- Location in Spain
- Coordinates: 39°16′59″N 2°19′0″W
- Country: Spain
- Autonomous community: Castile-La Mancha
- Province: Albacete
- Comarca: La Mancha del Júcar-Centro
- Judicial district: La Roda

Area
  - Total: 69.83 km^{2} (26.96 sq mi)
- Elevation: 753 m (2,470 ft)

Population (2025-01-01)
  - Total: 1,381
  - Density: 19.78/km^{2} (51.22/sq mi)
- Demonym: minayero/a
- Time zone: UTC+1 (CET)
  - Summer (DST): UTC+2 (CEST)
- Postal code: 02620
- Dialing code: 967
- Website: Ayuntamiento de Minaya.

Minaya is a municipality in Albacete, Castile-La Mancha, Spain.
