= Everolimus =

Chemical compound

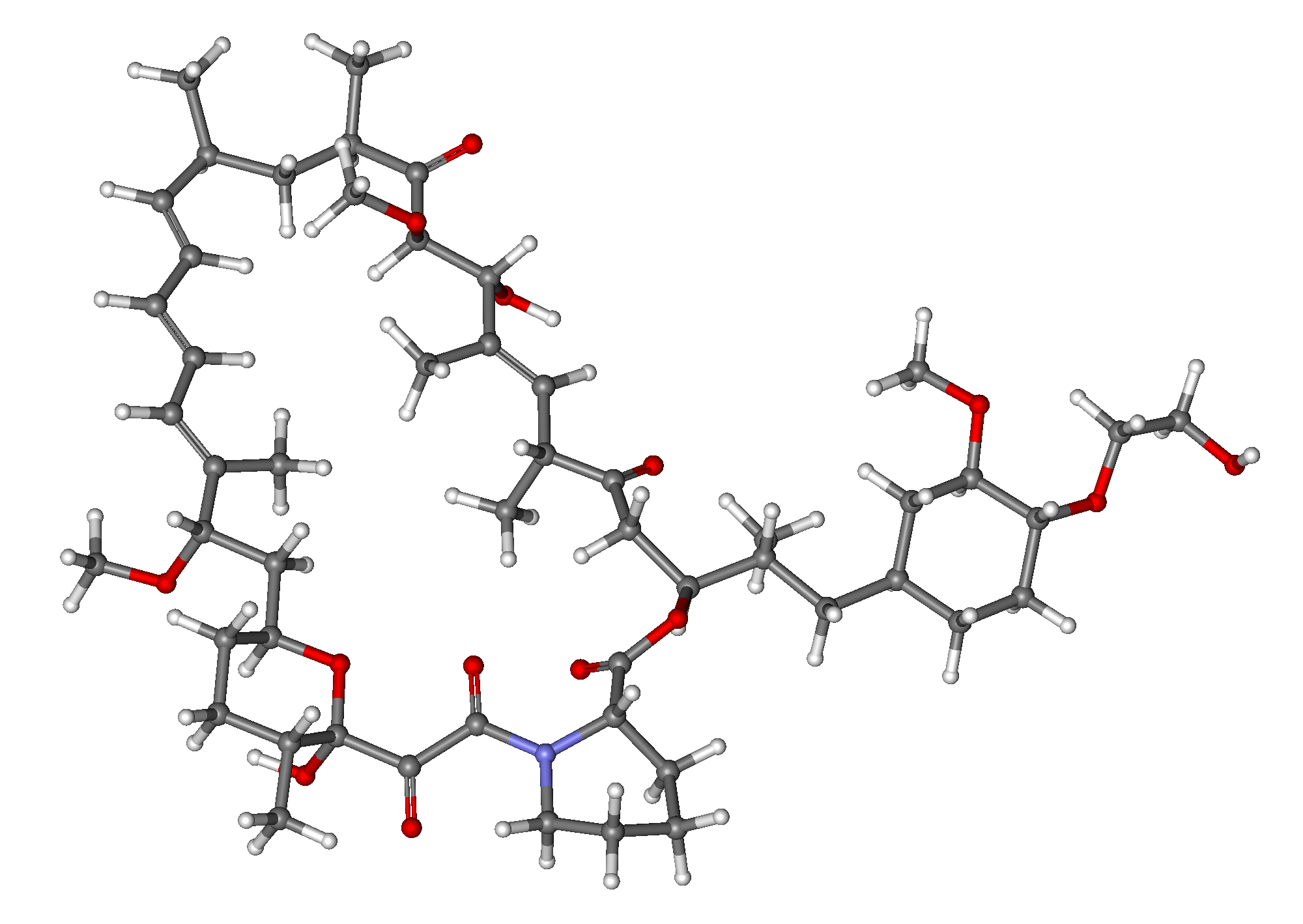

Clinical data
- Pronunciation: Everolimus /ˌɛvəˈroʊləməs/
- Trade names: Afinitor, Zortress
- Other names: 42-O-(2-hydroxyethyl)rapamycin, RAD001
- AHFS/Drugs.com: Monograph
- MedlinePlus: a609032
- License data: US DailyMed: Everolimus
- Pregnancy category: AU: C
- Routes of administration: By mouth
- ATC code: L01EG02 (WHO) L04AH02 (WHO)

Legal status
- Legal status: AU: S4 (Prescription only); UK: US: ℞-only; EU: Rx-only; In general: ℞ (Prescription only)

Pharmacokinetic data
- Elimination half-life: ~30 hours

Identifiers
- IUPAC name: Dihydroxy-12-[(2R)-1-[(1S,3R,4R)-4-(2-hydroxyethoxy)-3-methoxycyclohexyl]propan-2-yl]-19,30-dimethoxy-15,17,21,23,29,35-hexamethyl-11,36-dioxa-4-azatricyclo[30.3.1.0 hexatriaconta-16,24,26,28-tetraene-2,3,10,14,20-pentone
- CAS Number: 159351-69-6
- PubChem CID: 6442177
- DrugBank: DB01590
- ChemSpider: 21106307
- UNII: 9HW64Q8G6G
- KEGG: D02714
- ChEBI: CHEBI:68478
- ChEMBL: ChEMBL1908360
- CompTox Dashboard (EPA): DTXSID0040599
- ECHA InfoCard: 100.149.896

Chemical and physical data
- Formula: C_{53}H_{83}NO_{14}
- Molar mass: 958.240 g·mol^{−1}
- 3D model (JSmol): Interactive image
- SMILES: OCCO[C@@H]1CC[C@H](C[C@H]1OC)C[C@@H](C)[C@@H]4CC(=O)[C@H](C)/C=C(\C)[C@@H](O)[C@@H](OC)C(=O)[C@H](C)C[C@H](C)\C=C\C=C\C=C(/C)[C@@H](OC)C[C@@H]2CC[C@@H](C)[C@@](O)(O2)C(=O)C(=O)N3CCCC[C@H]3C(=O)O4
- InChI: InChI=1S/C53H83NO14/c1-32-16-12-11-13-17-33(2)44(63-8)30-40-21-19-38(7)53(62,68-40)50(59)51(60)54-23-15-14-18-41(54)52(61)67-45(35(4)28-39-20-22-43(66-25-24-55)46(29-39)64-9)31-42(56)34(3)27-37(6)48(58)49(65-10)47(57)36(5)26-32/h11-13,16-17,27,32,34-36,38-41,43-46,48-49,55,58,62H,14-15,18-26,28-31H2,1-10H3/b13-11+,16-12+,33-17+,37-27+/t32-,34-,35-,36-,38-,39+,40+,41+,43-,44+,45+,46-,48-,49+,53-/m1/s1; Key:HKVAMNSJSFKALM-GKUWKFKPSA-N

Everolimus, sold under the brand name Afinitor among others, is a medication used as an immunosuppressant to prevent rejection of organ transplants and as a targeted therapy in the treatment of renal cell cancer and other tumours.

This compound also has a use in cardiovascular drug-eluting stent technologies to inhibit restenosis.

It is the 40-O-(2-hydroxyethyl) derivative of sirolimus and works similarly to sirolimus as an inhibitor of mammalian target of rapamycin (mTOR).

It is marketed by Novartis under the trade names Zortress (US) and Certican (European Union and other countries) in transplantation medicine, and as Afinitor (general tumours) and Votubia (tumours as a result of Tuberous Sclerosis Complex (TSC)) in oncology.

It is on the World Health Organization's List of Essential Medicines. It is available as a generic medication.

== Medical uses ==
Everolimus is approved for various conditions:

- Advanced kidney cancer (US FDA approved in March 2009)
- Prevention of organ rejection after renal transplant(US FDA April 2010)
- Subependymal giant cell astrocytoma (SEGA) associated with tuberous sclerosis (TS) in patients who are not suitable for surgical intervention (US FDA October 2010)
- Progressive or metastatic pancreatic neuroendocrine tumors not surgically removable (May 2011)
- Breast cancer in post-menopausal women with advanced hormone-receptor positive, HER2-negative type cancer, in conjunction with exemestane (US FDA July 2012)
- Prevention of organ rejection after liver transplant(Feb 2013)
- Progressive, well-differentiated non-functional, neuroendocrine tumors (NET) of gastrointestinal (GI) or lung origin with unresectable, locally advanced or metastatic disease (US FDA February 2016).
- Tuberous sclerosis complex-associated partial-onset seizures for adult and pediatric patients aged 2 years and older. (US FDA April 2018).

== UK National Health Service ==
NHS England has been criticised for delays in deciding on a policy for the prescription of everolimus in the treatment of Tuberous Sclerosis. 20 doctors addressed a letter to the board in support of the charity Tuberous Sclerosis Association saying " around 32 patients with critical need, whose doctors believe everolimus treatment is their best or only option, have no hope of access to funding. Most have been waiting many months. Approximately half of these patients are at imminent risk of a catastrophic event (renal bleed or kidney failure) with a high risk of preventable death." In May 2015 it was reported that Luke Henry and Stephanie Rudwick, the parents of a child suffering from Tuberous Sclerosis were trying to sell their home in Brighton to raise £30,000 to pay for treatment for their daughter Bethany who has tumours on her brain, kidneys and liver and suffers from up to 50 epileptic fits a day.

== Clinical trials ==
As of October 2010, Phase III trials are under way in gastric cancer, hepatocellular carcinoma, and lymphoma. The experimental use of everolimus in refractory chronic graft-versus-host disease was reported in 2012.

Interim phase III trial results in 2011, showed that adding Afinitor (everolimus) to exemestane therapy against advanced breast cancer can significantly improve progression-free survival compared with exemestane therapy alone.

A study published in 2012, shows that everolimus sensitivity varies between patients depending on their tumor genomes. A group of patients with advanced metastasic bladder carcinoma treated with everolimus revealed a single patient who had a complete response to everolimus treatment for 26 months. The researchers sequenced the genome of this patient and compared it to different reference genomes and to other patients' genomes. They found that mutations in TSC1 led to a lengthened duration of response to everolimus and to an increase in the time to cancer recurrence. The mutated TSC1 apparently had made these tumors vulnerable to treatment with everolimus.

A phase IIa randomized, placebo-controlled everolimus clinical trial published in 2014 showed that everolimus improved the response to an influenza vaccine by 20% in healthy elderly volunteers. A phase IIa randomized, placebo-controlled clinical trial published in 2018 showed that everolimus in combination with dactolisib decreased the rate of reported infections in an elderly population.

== Mechanism ==
Compared with the parent compound rapamycin, everolimus is more water-soluble. Compared to rapamycin, everolimus is more selective for the mTORC1 protein complex, with little impact on the mTORC2 complex. This can lead to a hyper-activation of the kinase AKT via inhibition on the mTORC1 negative feedback loop, while not inhibiting the mTORC2 positive feedback to AKT. This AKT elevation can lead to longer survival in some cell types. Thus, everolimus has important effects on cell growth, cell proliferation and cell survival.

mTORC1 inhibition by everolimus has been shown to normalize tumor blood vessels, to increase tumor-infiltrating lymphocytes, and to improve adoptive cell transfer therapy.

Additionally, mTORC2 is believed to play an important role in glucose metabolism and the immune system, suggesting that selective inhibition of mTORC1 by drugs such as everolimus could achieve many of the benefits of rapamycin without the associated glucose intolerance and immunosuppression.

TSC1 and TSC2, the genes involved in tuberous sclerosis, act as tumor suppressor genes by regulating mTORC1 activity. Thus, either the loss or inactivation of one of these genes lead to the activation of mTORC1.

Everolimus binds to its protein receptor FKBP12, which directly interacts with mTORC1, inhibiting its downstream signaling. As a consequence, mRNAs that code for proteins implicated in the cell cycle and in the glycolysis process are impaired or altered, and tumor growth is inhibited.

== Adverse reactions ==
A trial using 10 mg/day in patients with NETs of GI or lung origin reported "Everolimus was discontinued for adverse reactions in 29% of patients and dose reduction or delay was required in 70% of everolimus-treated patients. Serious adverse reactions occurred in 42% of everolimus-treated patients and included 3 fatal events (cardiac failure, respiratory failure, and septic shock). The most common adverse reactions (incidence greater than or equal to 30%) were stomatitis, infections, diarrhea, peripheral edema, fatigue and rash. The most common blood abnormalities found (incidence greater than or equal to 50%) were anemia, hypercholesterolemia, lymphopenia, elevated aspartate transaminase (AST) and fasting hyperglycemia.".

== Role in heart transplantation ==
Everolimus may have a role in heart transplantation, as it has been shown to reduce chronic allograft vasculopathy in such transplants. It also may have a similar role to sirolimus in kidney and other transplants.

== Role in liver transplantation ==
Although sirolimus had generated fears over use of m-TOR inhibitors in liver transplantation recipients, due to possible early hepatic artery thrombosis and graft loss, use of everolimus in the setting of liver transplantation is promising. Jeng et al., in their study of 43 patients, concluded the safety of everolimus in the early phase after living donor liver transplantation. In their study, no hepatic artery thrombosis or wound infection was noted. Also, a possible role of everolimus in reducing the recurrence of hepatocellular carcinoma after liver transplantation was correlated. A target trough level of 3 ng/mL at 3 months was shown to be beneficial in recipients with pre-transplant renal dysfunction. In their study, 6 of 9 renal failure patients showed significant recovery of renal function, whereas 3 showed further deterioration, one of whom required hemodialysis. A positive impact on hepatocellular carcinoma (HCC) was observed when everolimus was used as primary immunosuppression starting as early as first week after living donor liver transplantation (LDLT) surgery.

== Use in vascular stents ==
Everolimus is used in drug-eluting coronary stents as an immunosuppressant to prevent restenosis. Abbott Vascular produce an everolimus-eluting stent (EES) called Xience Alpine. It utilizes the Multi-Link Vision cobalt chromium stent platform and Novartis' everolimus. The product is widely available globally including the US, the European Union, and Asia-Pacific (APAC) countries. Boston Scientific also market EESes, recent offerings being Promus Elite and Synergy.

== Use in aging ==
Inhibition of mTOR, the molecular target of everolimus, extends the lifespan of model organisms including mice, and mTOR inhibition has been suggested as an anti-aging therapy. Everolimus was used in a clinical trial by Novartis, and short-term treatment was shown to enhance the response to the influenza vaccine in the elderly, possible by reversing immunosenescence. Everolimus treatment of mice results in reduced metabolic side effects compared to sirolimus.
