= Heinrich Vogt (neurologist) =

German neurologist (1875–1957)

Heinrich Vogt (23 April 1875, in Regensburg – 24 September 1957, in Bad Pyrmont) was a German neurologist. He published papers on tuberous sclerosis and Batten disease, and was the author of a handbook on the treatment of nervous diseases.

In 1901 he obtained his habilitation for neurology, and six years later became a professor of psychiatry at the University of Göttingen. In 1909 he was named director of the department of psychiatry at the Senckenberg Institute in Frankfurt am Main. In 1911 he was appointed director of a neurological sanatorium in Wiesbaden. In 1925 he moved to the spa town of Bad Pyrmont, where he worked as a medical hydrologist. He later opened a research institute of balneology in Breslau, but when the city became part of Poland, he returned to Bad Pyrmont.

Vogt was amongst the first physicians to study "juvenile amaurotic familial idiocy" (Batten disease). He published two papers on the subject in 1905 and 1911.

In 1908, Vogt published a paper Zur Diagnostik der tuberösen Sklerose ("The Diagnosis of Tuberous Sclerosis"). He established three pathognomonic clinical signs for the condition: epilepsy, idiocy and adenoma sebaceum. These became known as "Vogt's triad" and helped define the condition for the next 60 years. This shouldn't be confused with the "Vogt's triad" seen in glaucoma, which is named after the Swiss ophthalmologist Alfred Vogt.

His two-volume Handbuch der Therapie der Nervenkrankheiten ("Handbook on the Treatment of Nervous Diseases") was published in 1916.

== See also ==
- Timeline of tuberous sclerosis
