= CYP107G1 =

Identifiers
- Organism: Streptomyces rapamycinicus
- Symbol: CYP107G1

Cytochrome P450 family 107 subfamily G member 1 (abbreviated CYP107G1) is an actinobacterial Cytochrome P450 enzyme originally from Streptomyces rapamycinicus, which catalyzes the oxidation reaction of C27 of pre-rapamycin in the biosynthesis pathway of the macrolide antibiotic rapamycin.
