= Nagstatin =

Names
- IUPAC name 2-[(5R,6S,7R,8S)-8-acetamido-6,7-dihydroxy-5-(hydroxymethyl)-5,6,7,8-tetrahydroimidazo[1,2-a]pyridin-3-yl]acetic acid

Identifiers
CAS Number	126844-81-3
3D model (JSmol)	Interactive image
ChEMBL	ChEMBL596543
ChemSpider	78442903; 115763
PubChem CID	10266740
- InChI: InChI=1S/C12H17N3O6/c1-5(17)14-9-11(21)10(20)7(4-16)15-6(2-8(18)19)3-13-12(9)15/h3,7,9-11,16,20-21H,2,4H2,1H3,(H,14,17)(H,18,19)/t7-,9-,10+,11-/m1/s1 Key: OBMORLCFLUTVPI-CZULRBLNSA-N
- SMILES: CC(=O)N[C@@H]1[C@H]([C@H]([C@H](N2C1=NC(=C2)CC(=O)O)CO)O)O

Properties
Chemical formula	C_{12}H_{17}N_{3}O_{6}
Molar mass	299.283 g·mol^{−1}
Melting point	190-195 °C
- Except where otherwise noted, data are given for materials in their standard state (at 25 °C [77 °F], 100 kPa). Infobox references

Nagstatin is a strong competitive inhibitor of the N-acetyl-β-d-glucosaminidase with the molecular formula C_{12}H_{17}N_{3}O_{6}. Nagstatin is produced by the bacterium Streptomyces amakusaensis.
