= DDIT4 =

Protein-coding gene in the species Homo sapiens

Available structures
PDB	Ortholog search: PDBe RCSB
PDB	List of PDB id codes 3LQ9

Identifiers
- Aliases: DDIT4, Dig2, REDD-1, REDD1, DNA damage inducible transcript 4
- External IDs: OMIM: 607729; MGI: 1921997; HomoloGene: 10400; GeneCards: DDIT4; OMA:DDIT4 - orthologs

Gene location (Human)
Chr.	Chromosome 10 (human)
Band	10q22.1	Start	72,273,919 bp
Band	10q22.1	End	72,276,036 bp

Gene location (Mouse)
Chr.	Chromosome 10 (mouse)
Band	10|10 B4	Start	59,785,491 bp
Band	10|10 B4	End	59,787,656 bp
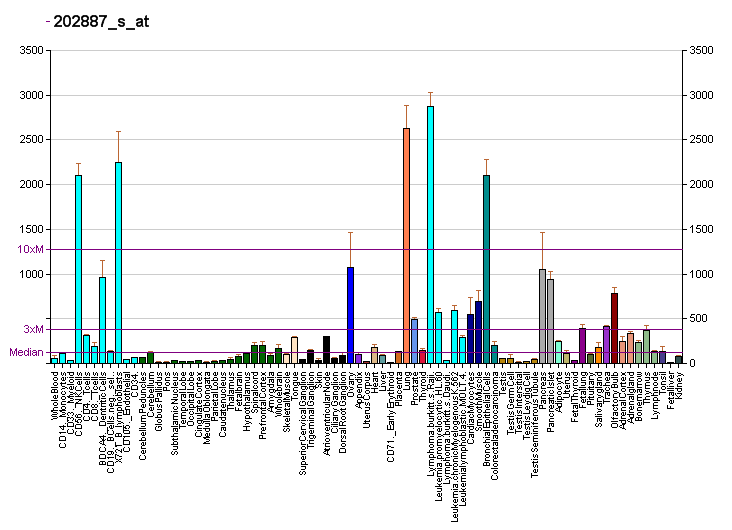
RNA expression pattern
Bgee	Human / Mouse (ortholog); Top expressed in: pericardium; right ovary; vena cava; left ovary; tibial nerve; mucosa of pharynx; olfactory zone of nasal mucosa; vagina; body of pancreas; trachea / Top expressed in: aortic valve; muscle of thigh; cumulus cell; ascending aorta; Ileal epithelium; neural layer of retina; stroma of bone marrow; medial ganglionic eminence; calvaria; secondary oocyte; More reference expression data
BioGPS	More reference expression data
Gene ontology
Molecular function	14-3-3 protein binding
Cellular component	cytoplasm; mitochondrion; intracellular anatomical structure; cytosol
Biological process	response to hypoxia; negative regulation of peptidyl-threonine phosphorylation; negative regulation of glycolytic process; neurotrophin TRK receptor signaling pathway; negative regulation of intracellular signal transduction; positive regulation of neuron death; brain development; intrinsic apoptotic signaling pathway in response to DNA damage by p53 class mediator; apoptotic process; reactive oxygen species metabolic process; cell population proliferation; neuron differentiation; negative regulation of peptidyl-serine phosphorylation; neuron migration; negative regulation of signal transduction; negative regulation of TOR signaling; cellular response to dexamethasone stimulus; defense response to virus; protein-containing complex disassembly; regulation of TOR signaling
Sources:Amigo / QuickGO
Orthologs
Species	Human	Mouse
Entrez	54541	74747
Ensembl	ENSG00000168209	ENSMUSG00000020108
UniProt	Q9NX09	Q9D3F7
RefSeq (mRNA)	NM_019058	NM_029083
RefSeq (protein)	NP_061931	NP_083359
Location (UCSC)	Chr 10: 72.27 – 72.28 Mb	Chr 10: 59.79 – 59.79 Mb
PubMed search
- Wikidata
View/Edit Human	View/Edit Mouse

DNA-damage-inducible transcript 4 (DDIT4) protein also known as protein regulated in development and DNA damage response 1 (REDD1) is a protein that in humans is encoded by the DDIT4 gene.

== Function ==
DDIT4 acts as a negative regulator of mTOR, a serine/threonine kinase that regulates a variety of cellular functions such as growth, proliferation and autophagy. In particular, upregulation of HIF-1 in response to hypoxia upregulates DDIT4, leading to activation of Tsc1/2 via 14–3–3 shuttling and subsequent downregulation of mTOR via Rheb. In addition to hypoxia, DDIT4 expression has also been shown to be activated by DNA damage and energy stress.

== Clinical significance ==
Clinical interest in DDIT4 is based primarily on its effect on mTOR, which has been associated with aging and linked with diseases such as tuberous sclerosis, lymphangioleiomyomatosis, diabetes, and cancer. In particular, the overactivation of mTOR in many cancer types has led to the development of mTOR inhibitors for cancer treatment. DDIT4 has begun to receive attention in this regard via the diabetes drug Metformin which has been shown to reduce cancer risk and increase DDIT4 expression.

== See also ==
- HIF1A
- Tuberous sclerosis protein
- MTOR
- 14-3-3 protein
- DDIT4L/ REDD2
