= Angiomyolipoma =

Benign tumor of the kidney

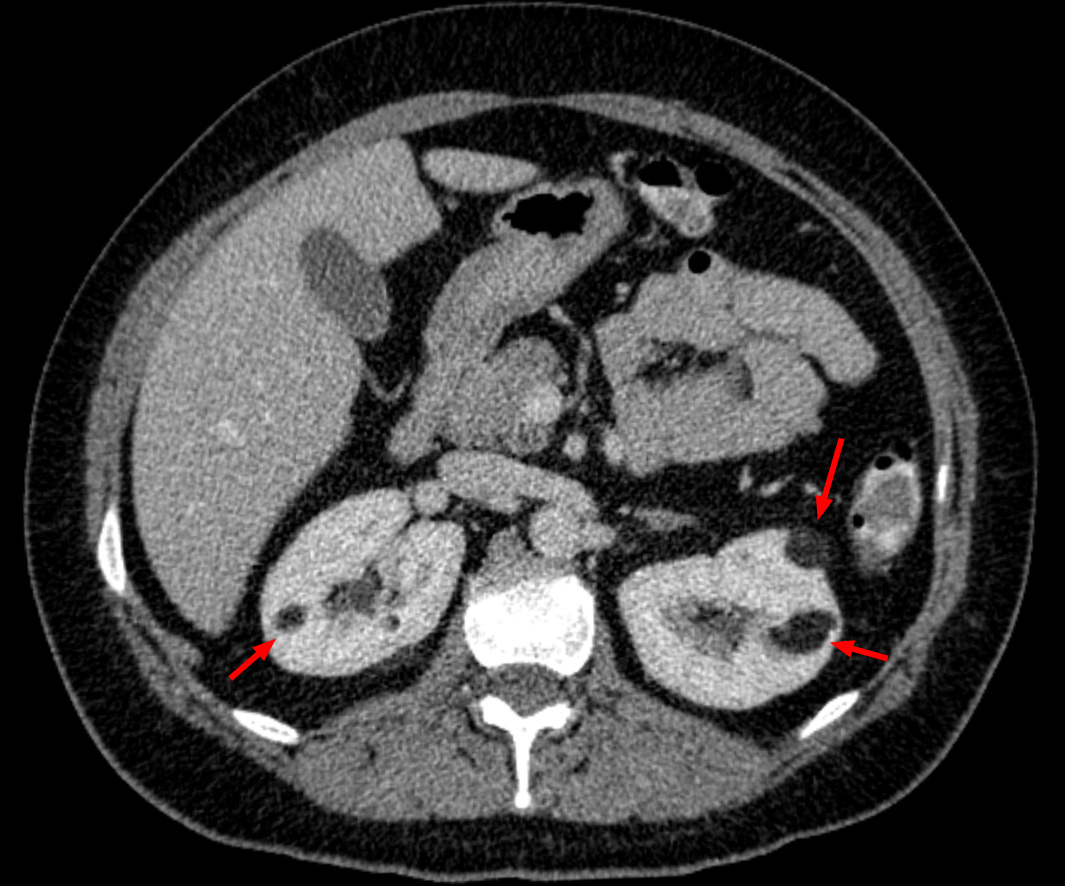
- Angiomyolipoma in both kidneys (arrows) in computer tomography. The tumours are hypodense (dark) due to fat content.
- Specialty: Oncology

Angiomyolipomas are the most common benign tumour of the kidney. Although regarded as benign, angiomyolipomas may grow such that kidney function is impaired or the blood vessels may dilate and burst, leading to bleeding.

Angiomyolipomas are strongly associated with the genetic disease tuberous sclerosis, in which most individuals have several angiomyolipomas affecting both kidneys. They are also commonly found in women with the rare lung disease lymphangioleiomyomatosis. Angiomyolipomas are less commonly found in the liver and rarely in other organs. Whether associated with these diseases or sporadic, angiomyolipomas are caused by mutations in either the TSC1 or TSC2 genes, which govern cell growth and proliferation. They are composed of blood vessels, smooth muscle cells, and fat cells.

Large angiomyolipomas can be treated with embolisation. Drug therapy for angiomyolipomas is at the research stage. The Tuberous Sclerosis Alliance has published guidelines on diagnosis, surveillance, and management.

== Signs and symptoms ==
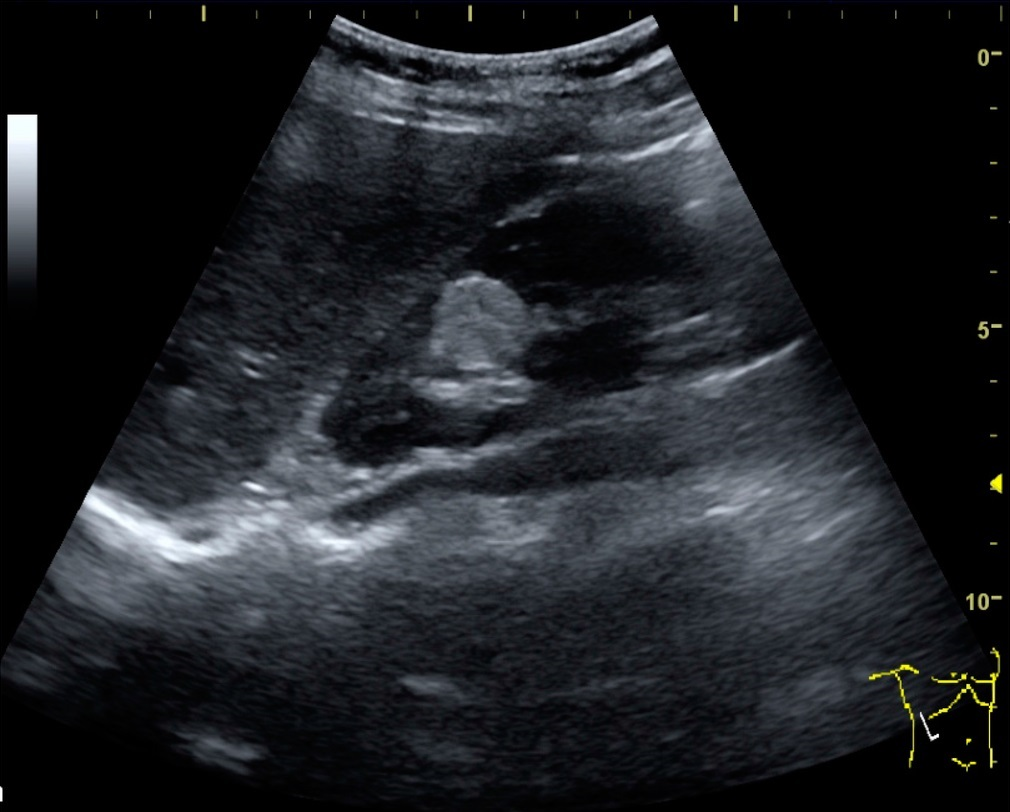
Angiomyolipoma seen as a hyperechoic mass in the upper pole of an adult kidney on renal ultrasonography.

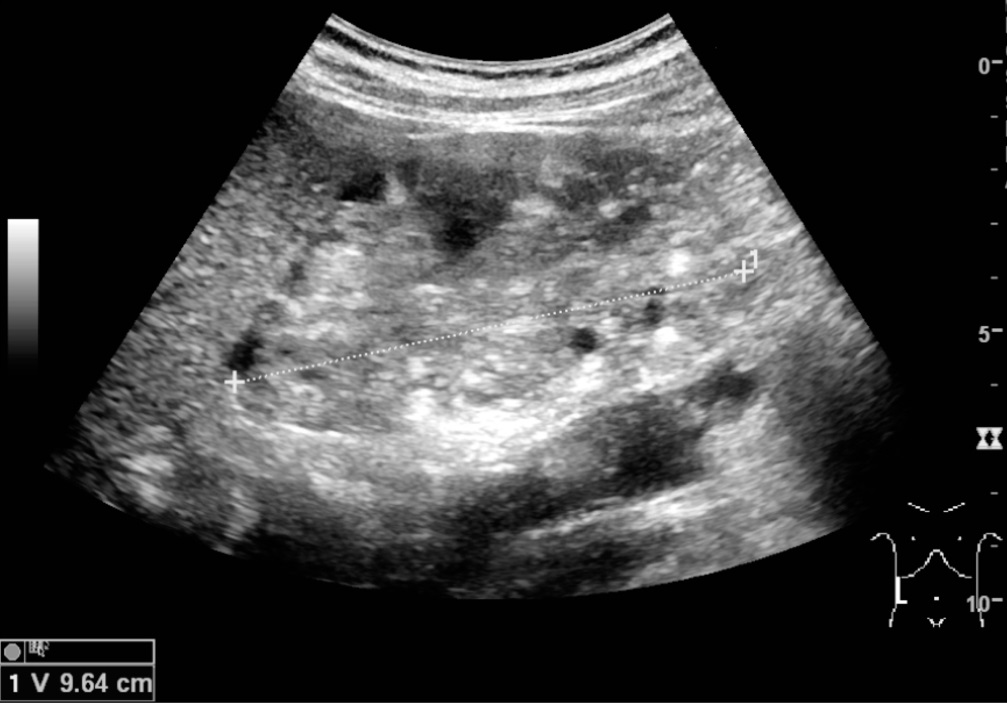
Renal ultrasonography of a person with tuberous sclerosis and multiple angiomyolipomas in the kidney: Measurement of kidney length on the US image is illustrated by '+' and a dashed line.

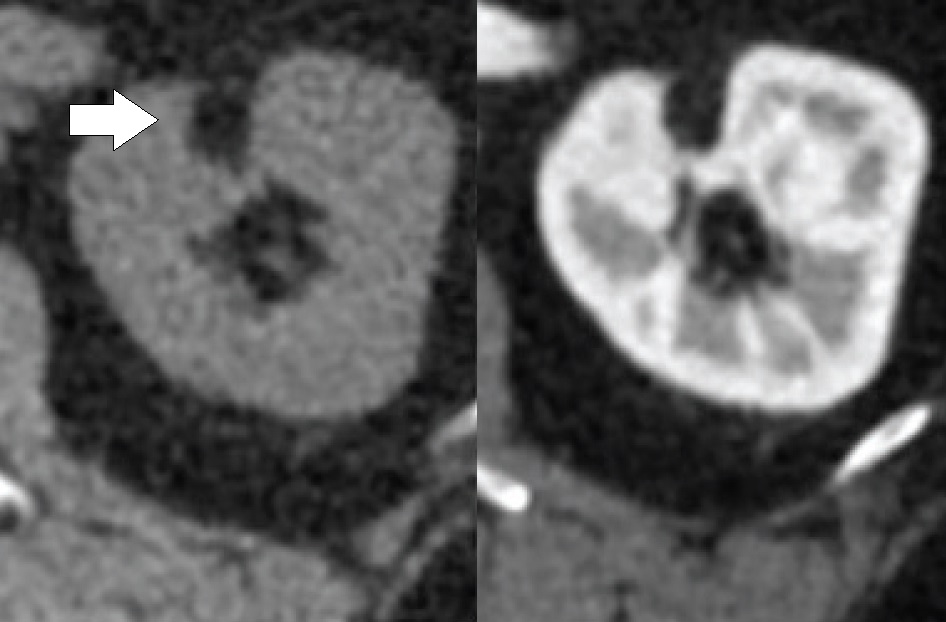
CT scan of a renal angiomyolipoma. It involves the renal cortex, and has an attenuation of less than 20 HU on the Hounsfield scale, which are typical characteristics.

Most people with benign angiomyolipomas do not show signs or have symptoms. However, symptoms can occur if the dilated blood vessels in an angiomyolipoma rupture; this is called a retroperitoneal hemorrhage. This can cause pain in the back, nausea and vomiting. Some long-term effects are anemia, hypertension, and chronic kidney disease. Up to 20% of patients who present symptoms, and are brought into the emergency department, are in shock.

== Pathophysiology ==
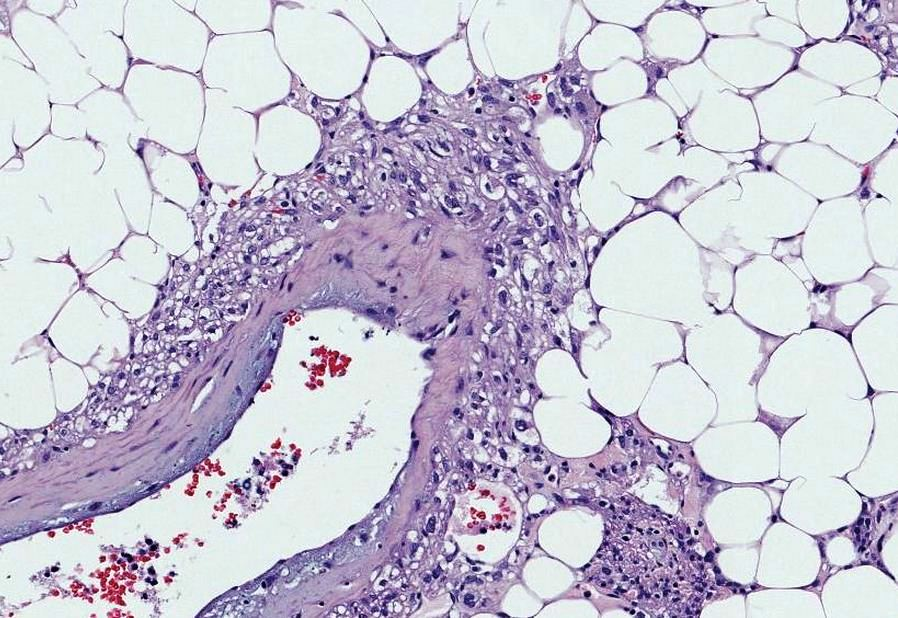
Myoid cells with clear cytoplasm spinning off of large vessels in a background of mature fat, the classic microscopic features of angiomyolipoma

Angiomyolipomas are tumours consisting of perivascular epithelioid cells (cells which are found surrounding blood vessels and which resemble epithelial cells). A tumour of this kind is known as a PEComa, from the initials of perivascular epithelioid cell. Older literature may classify them as hamartomas (benign tumours consisting of cells in their correct location, but forming a disorganised mass) or choristoma (benign tumours consisting of normal cells in the wrong location). PEComas are themselves a kind of mesenchymal tumour which involves cells that form the connective tissue, cardiovascular, and lymphatic systems.

An angiomyolipoma is composed of varying proportions of vascular cells, immature smooth muscle cells, and fat cells.

Angiomyolipomas are typically found in the kidney, but have also been commonly found in the liver and less commonly the ovary, fallopian tube, spermatic cord, palate, and colon. The Maclean imaging classification system for renal angiomyolipomas is based on the location of the angiomyolipoma within the kidney.

Since all three components of an angiomyolipoma (vascular cells, immature smooth muscle cells, and fat cells) contain a "second-hit" mutation, they are believed to have derived from a common progenitor cell that developed the common second-hit mutation.

== Diagnosis ==
Three methods of scanning can detect angiomyolipomas: ultrasound, computed tomography (CT), and magnetic resonance imaging (MRI). Ultrasound is standard and is particularly sensitive to the fat in angiomyolipomas, but less so to the solid components. However, accurate measurements are hard to make with ultrasound, particularly if the angiomyolipoma is near the surface of the kidney (grade III). CT is very detailed and fast, and allows accurate measurement. However, it exposes the patient to radiation and the dangers that a contrast dye used to aid the scanning may itself harm the kidneys. MRI is safer than CT, but many patients (particularly those with the learning difficulties or behavioural problems found in tuberous sclerosis) require sedation or general anaesthesia, and the scan cannot be performed quickly. Some other kidney tumours contain fat, so the presence of fat is not diagnostic. Distinguishing a fat-poor angiomyolipoma from a renal cell carcinoma (RCC) can be difficult. Both minimal fat AMLs and 80% of the clear-cell type of RCCs display signal drop on an out-of-phase MRI sequence compared to in-phase. Thus, a lesion growing at greater than 5 mm per year may warrant a biopsy for diagnosis.

Incidental discovery of angiomyolipomas (AML) should trigger consideration of tuberous sclerosis complex (TSC), especially those who aged 18 to 40 years, and those with bilateral angiomyolipomas. Those with AML and TSC has 20 to 50% chance of having haemorrhage from AML, and of those having haemorrhages, 20% of them have life-threatening haemorrhages.

== Treatment ==
Everolimus is US Food and Drug Administration-approved for the treatment of angiomyolipomas. Treatment should be considered for asymptomatic, growing AMLs measuring larger than 3 cm in diameter.

Angiomyolipomas do not normally require surgery unless life-threatening bleeding is present. Some centers may perform preventative selective embolisation of the angiomyolipoma if it is more than 4 cm in diameter, due to the risk of hemorrhage.

People with tuberous sclerosis are advised to have yearly renal scans, though patients with very stable lesions could be monitored less frequently. The research in this area is lacking. Even if no angiomyolipoma is found, one can develop at any life stage. The angiomyolipoma can grow rapidly.

In tuberous sclerosis, typically, many angiomyolipomas affect each kidney. Not uncommonly, more than one intervention may be required during lifetime. Since kidney function may already be impaired (up to half the kidney may be lost before function loss is detectable), preserving as much kidney as possible is vital when removing any lesion. Large angiomyolipomas are treated by embolization, which reduces the risk of hemorrhage and can also shrink the lesion. A side effect of this treatment is postembolisation syndrome, severe pain and fever, but this is easily managed and lasts only a few days.

A ruptured aneurysm in an angiomyolipoma leads to blood loss that must be stopped (though embolisation) and compensated for (through intravenous fluid replacement). Therefore, removal of the affected kidney (nephrectomy) is strongly discouraged, though may occur if the emergency department is not knowledgeable about tuberous sclerosis.

Embolisation involves inserting a catheter along the blood vessels to the tumour. The blood vessels are then blocked, typically by injecting ethanol or inert particles. The procedure can be very painful, so analgesics are used. The destroyed kidney tissue often causes postembolisation syndrome, which manifests as nausea, vomiting, fever, and abdominal pain, and lasts a few days. Embolisation (in general) has an 8% rate of morbidity and a 2.5% rate of mortality, so is not considered lightly.

Patients with kidney loss should be monitored for hypertension (and treated for it if discovered) and avoid nephrotoxic drugs such as certain pain relievers and intravenous contrast agents. Such patients who are unable to communicate effectively (due to age or intellectual disability) are at risk of dehydration. Where multiple or large angiomyolipomas have caused chronic kidney disease, dialysis is required.

Robotic assisted partial nephrectomy has been proposed as a surgical treatment of a ruptured angiomyolipoma combining the advantages both of a kidney preservation procedure and the benefits of a minimal invasive procedure without compromising the safety of the patient.

=== Follow-up ===
It is suggested that no follow-up is needed for angiomyolipoma-like incidental imaging findings measuring less than 1 or 2 cm. Alternatively, a renal ultrasonography every three or four years has been suggested for angiomyolipoma-like masses measuring less than 2 cm. For those measuring 2 to 4 cm, annual ultrasonography is recommended. Those over 4 cm are usually surgically removed, but for those that are not, it is recommended to perform an ultrasonography after six months, and then annually if stable.

== Prognosis ==
Small angiomyolipomas and those without dilated blood vessels (aneurysms) cause few problems, but angiomyolipomas have been known to grow as rapidly as 4 cm in one year. Angiomyolipomas larger than 5 cm and those containing an aneurysm pose a significant risk of rupture, which is a medical emergency, as it is potentially life-threatening. One population study found the cumulative risk of hemorrhage to be 10% in males and 20% in females.

A second problem occurs when the renal angiomyolipomas take over so much kidney that the function is impaired, leading to chronic kidney disease. This may be severe enough to require dialysis. A population survey of patients with TSC and normal intelligence found 1% were on dialysis.

== Epidemiology ==
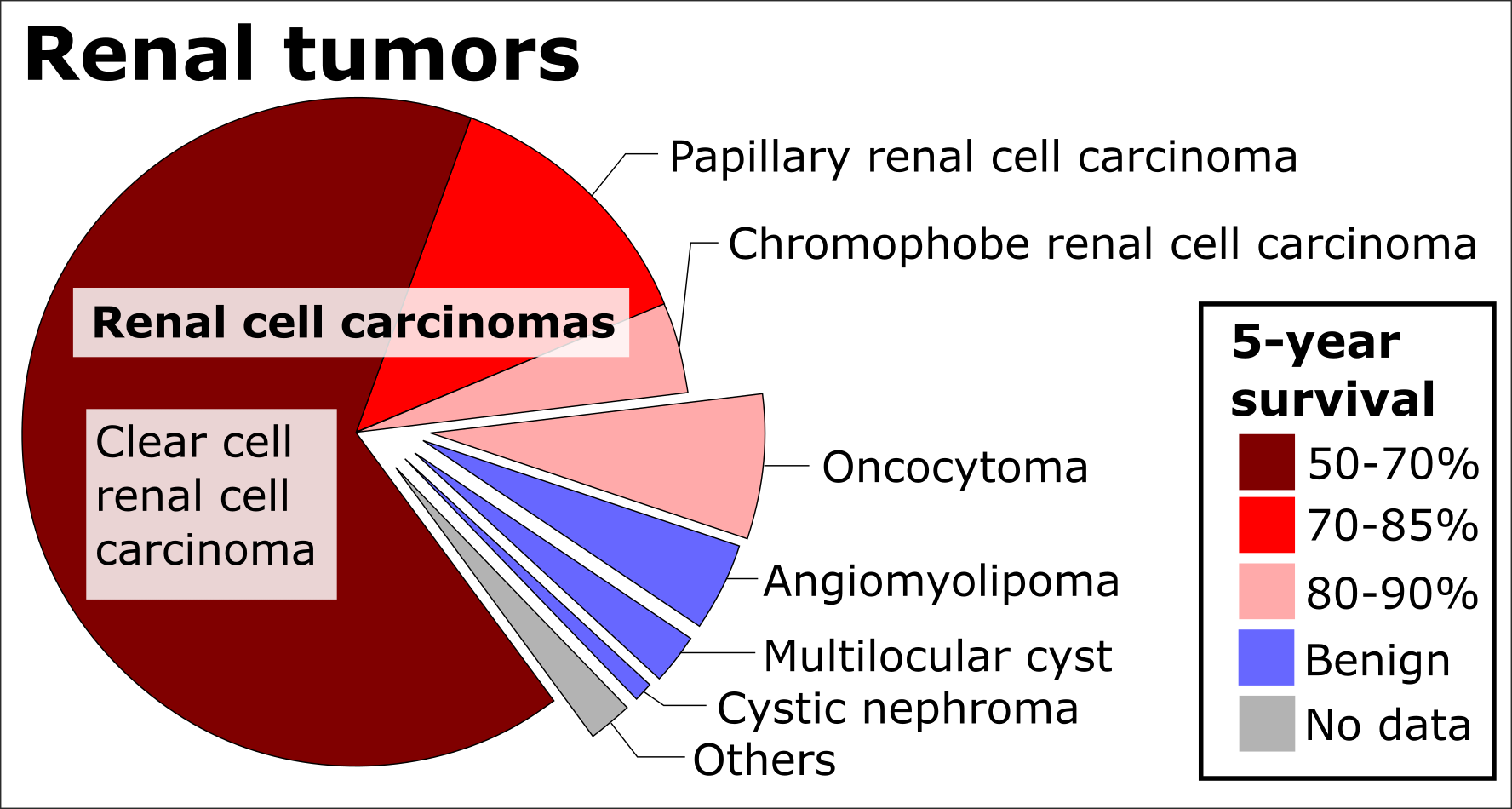
Histopathologic types of kidney tumour, with relative incidences and prognoses. Angiomyolipoma is seen at right in pie chart.

Angiomyolipomas are the most common benign tumour of the kidney, and are found either in patients with tuberous sclerosis or sporadically. About 80–90% of cases are sporadic, and these are most commonly found in middle-aged women.

In patients with TSC, a longitudinal study found 80% will have some form of renal lesion by around 10 years of age. Of these, 75% are angiomyolipomas and 17% are cysts. The angiomyolipomas increased in size in around 60% of these children. An autopsy study and TSC clinic survey found a prevalence of 67 and 85%, respectively, for patients with TSC. Both genders are affected equally.
