= Cytoskeleton regulator RNA =

CYTOR

Identifiers
- Aliases: CYTOR, C2orf59, NCRNA00152, LINC00152, long intergenic non-protein coding RNA 152, cytoskeleton regulator RNA
- External IDs: GeneCards: CYTOR

Gene location (Human)
Chr.	Chromosome 2 (human)
Band	2p11.2	Start	87,454,781 bp
Band	2p11.2	End	87,636,740 bp
RNA expression pattern
Bgee	Human / Mouse (ortholog); Top expressed in: bone marrow cell; monocyte; granulocyte; spleen; blood; epithelium of colon; subcutaneous adipose tissue; lymph node; islet of Langerhans; stromal cell of endometrium / n/a; More reference expression data
BioGPS	n/a
Orthologs
Databases	NCBI: entry; OMA: entry
Species	Human	Mouse
Entrez	112597	n/a
Ensembl	ENSG00000222041	n/a
UniProt	n a	n/a
RefSeq (mRNA)	n/a	n/a
RefSeq (protein)	n/a	n/a
Location (UCSC)	Chr 2: 87.45 – 87.64 Mb	n/a
PubMed search		n/a
- Wikidata
View/Edit Human

Cytoskeleton regulator RNA is a long non-coding RNA that in humans is encoded by the CYTOR gene.

CYTOR plays a role in breast cancer. It regulates genes involved in the EGFR/mammalian target of rapamycin pathway and is required for cell proliferation, cell migration, and cytoskeleton organization.
