= Streptomyces amakusaensis =

Scientific classification
- Domain: Bacteria
- Kingdom: Bacillati
- Phylum: Actinomycetota
- Class: Actinomycetia
- Order: Streptomycetales
- Family: Streptomycetaceae
- Genus: Streptomyces
- Species: S. amakusaensis

Binomial name
- Streptomyces amakusaensis Nagatsu et al. 1963

Type strain
- AS 4.1462, ATCC 23876, BCRC 13797, CBS 280.65, CBS 615.68, CCRC 13797, CGMCC 4.1462, DSM 40219, IFO 12835, IPCR (10-101), IPCR 10-101, ISP 5219, JCM 4167, JCM 4617, KCC S-0167, KCC S-0617, KCCM 40181, KCTC 9753, Lanoot R-8715, LMG 19350, NBRC 12835, NRRL B-3351, NRRL-ISP 5219, R-8715, RIA 1163, STM 0617, Suzuki 10-101, VKM Ac-995

Species of bacterium

Streptomyces amakusaensis is a bacterium species from the genus of Streptomyces which has been isolated from soil from the Amakusa Island in Japan. Streptomyces amakusaensis produces tuberin and nagstatin.

== See also ==
- List of Streptomyces species
