= Perivascular epithelioid cell tumour =

PEComa
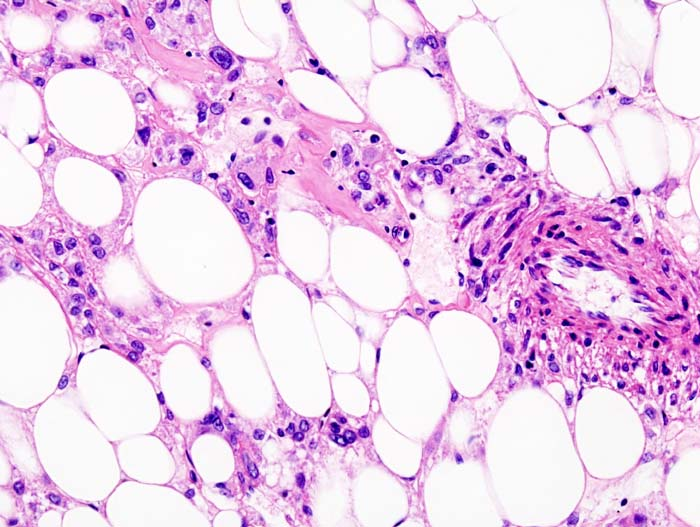
- Histopathologic image of renal angiomyolipoma. Nephrectomy specimen. H&E stain.
- Specialty: Oncology

Perivascular epithelioid cell tumour, also known as PEComa or PEC tumour, is a family of mesenchymal tumours consisting of perivascular epithelioid cells (PECs). These are rare tumours that can occur in any part of the human body.

The cell type from which these tumours originate remains unknown. Normally, no perivascular epitheloid cells exist; the name refers to the characteristics of the tumour when examined under the microscope.

Establishing the malignant potential of these tumours remains challenging although criteria have been suggested; some PEComas display malignant features whereas others can cautiously be labeled as having 'uncertain malignant potential'. The most common tumours in the PEComa family are renal angiomyolipoma and pulmonary lymphangioleiomyomatosis, both of which are more common in patients with tuberous sclerosis complex. The genes responsible for this multi-system genetic disease have also been implicated in other PEComas.

Many PEComa types shows a female predominance in the sex ratio.

== Cause ==
The precursor cell of PEComas is currently unknown; there is no normal counterpart "perivascular epitheloid cell". Genetically, PECs are linked to the tuberous sclerosis genes TSC1 and TSC2, although this link is stronger for angiomyolipoma and lymphangioleiomyomatosis than for other members of the PEComa family.

== Diagnosis ==
=== Histology ===
PECs consist of perivascular epithelioid cells with a clear/granular cytoplasm and central round nucleus without prominent nucleoli.

=== Immunohistochemical markers ===
PECs typically stain for melanocytic markers (HMB-45, Melan A (Mart 1), Mitf) and myogenic markers (actin, myosin, calponin).

=== Differential diagnosis ===
PECs bear significant histologic and immunohistochemical similarity to:

- angiomyolipoma,
- clear-cell "sugar" tumour (CCST),
- lymphangioleiomyomatosis, and,
- clear-cell myomelanocytic tumour of ligamentum teres/falciform ligament.
- abdominopelvic sarcoma of perivascular epitheloid cells
- primary extrapulmonary "sugar" tumour

Thus, it has been advocated that the above could be classified PEComas.

PEComas are rare and can have myriad features; therefore, they can be confused with carcinomas, smooth muscle tumours, adipocytic tumours, clear cell sarcomas, melanomas and gastrointestinal stromal tumours (GIST).
