= DDIT4L =

Protein-coding gene in the species Homo sapiens

Identifiers
- Aliases: DDIT4L, REDD2, Rtp801L, DNA damage inducible transcript 4 like
- External IDs: OMIM: 607730; MGI: 1920534; GeneCards: DDIT4L

Gene location (Human)
Chr.	Chromosome 4 (human)
Band	4q24	Start	100,185,870 bp
Band	4q24	End	100,190,782 bp

Gene location (Mouse)
Chr.	Chromosome 3 (mouse)
Band	3|3 G3	Start	137,327,373 bp
Band	3|3 G3	End	137,334,094 bp
RNA expression pattern
Bgee	Human / Mouse (ortholog); Top expressed in: deltoid muscle; tibialis anterior muscle; quadriceps femoris muscle; vastus lateralis muscle; Skeletal muscle tissue of biceps brachii; Skeletal muscle tissue of rectus abdominis; gastrocnemius muscle; muscle of thigh; cartilage tissue; body of tongue / Top expressed in: temporal muscle; sternocleidomastoid muscle; extraocular muscle; triceps brachii muscle; masseter muscle; quadriceps femoris muscle; digastric muscle; gastrocnemius muscle; medial head of gastrocnemius muscle; vastus lateralis muscle; More reference expression data
BioGPS	n/a
Gene ontology
Molecular function	protein binding
Cellular component	cytoplasm
Biological process	negative regulation of signal transduction
Sources:Amigo / QuickGO
Orthologs
Databases	NCBI: entry; OMA: entry
Species	Human	Mouse
Entrez	115265	73284
Ensembl	ENSG00000145358	ENSMUSG00000046818
UniProt	Q96D03	Q8VHZ5
RefSeq (mRNA)	NM_145244	NM_030143
RefSeq (protein)	NP_660287	NP_084419
Location (UCSC)	Chr 4: 100.19 – 100.19 Mb	Chr 3: 137.33 – 137.33 Mb
PubMed search
- Wikidata
View/Edit Human	View/Edit Mouse

DNA-damage-inducible transcript 4 like (DDIT4L) or regulated in development and DNA damage response 2 (REDD2) is a protein that in humans is encoded by the DDIT4L gene. The gene is located on chromosome 4 or chromosome 3 in human or mouse respectively.

== Function ==
DDIT4L is a negative regulator of mTOR. DDIT4L is a stress responsive protein, its expression is increased under the hypoxic condition and causes or sensitize towards cell death through the regulation mTOR activity and reduction of thioredoxin-1. Cardiomyocytes showed increase expression of DDIT4L under pathological stress, which promoted autophagy through the inhibition of mTORC1, not mTORC2.

== Role in Disease ==
In fibrosis, nuclear long noncoding RNA (lncRNA) H19X repressed DDIT4L gene expression, specifically interacting with a region upstream of the DDIT4L gene and increased collagen expression and fibrosis. Expression of DDIT4L is increased in pathological cardiac hypertrophy but not in those of physiological cardiac hypertrophy. Such mice had mild systolic dysfunction, increased baseline autophagy, reduced mTORC1 activity, and increased mTORC2 activity.

== See also ==
- DDIT4/ REDD1
- mTOR
- mTORC1
- mTORC2
