= Sirolimus =

Pharmaceutical drug

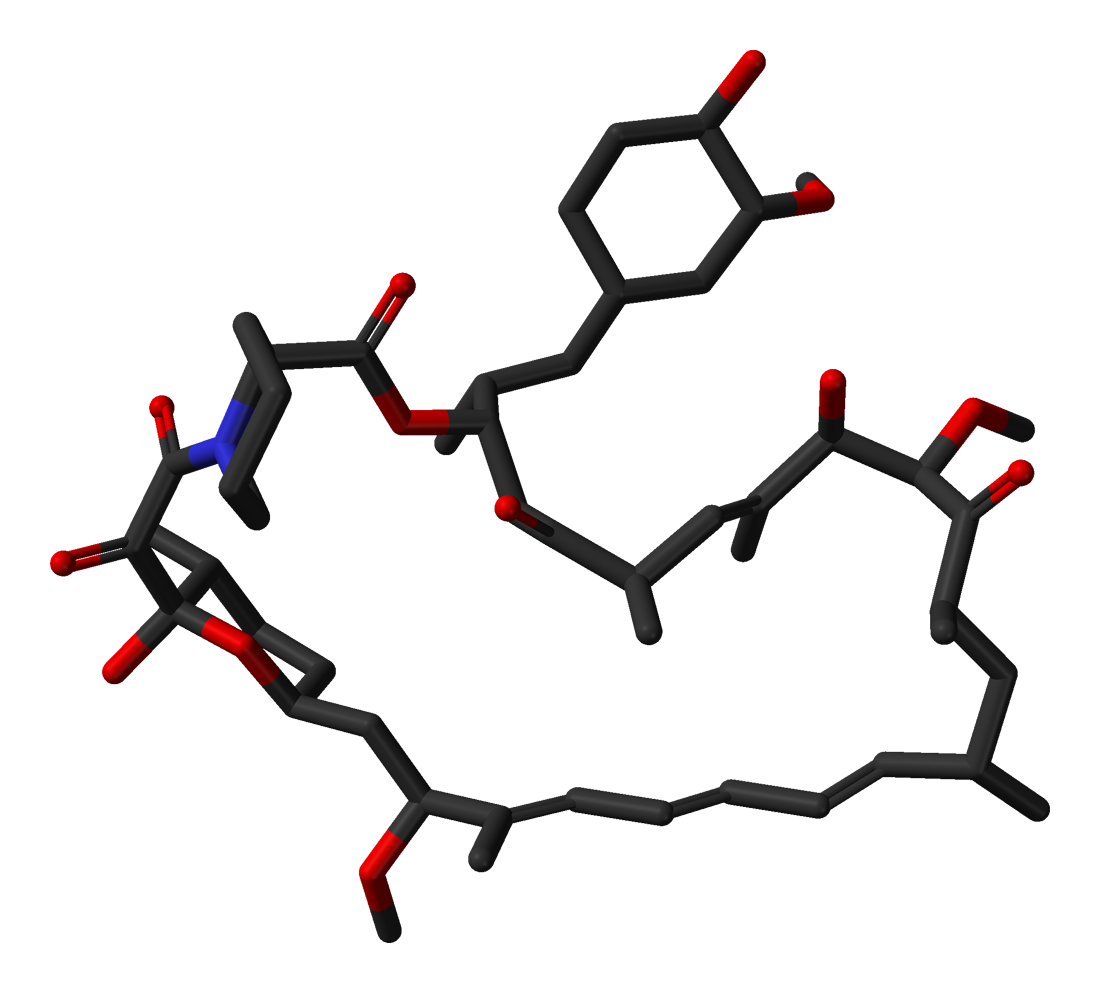

Clinical data
- Trade names: Rapamune, others
- Other names: Rapamycin, ABI-009
- License data: US DailyMed: Sirolimus
- Pregnancy category: AU: C
- Routes of administration: By mouth, intravenous, topical
- ATC code: L04AH01 (WHO) L01EG04 (WHO), S01XA23 (WHO), QC01EB90 (WHO)

Legal status
- Legal status: US: ℞-only; EU: Rx-only

Pharmacokinetic data
- Bioavailability: 14% (oral solution), lower with high-fat meals; 18% (tablet), higher with high-fat meals
- Protein binding: 92%
- Metabolism: Liver
- Elimination half-life: 57–63 hours
- Excretion: Mostly fecal

Identifiers
- IUPAC name: (1R,9S,12S,15R,16E,18R,19R,21R,23S,24E,26E,28E,30S,32S,35R)-1,18-dihydroxy-12-[(2R)-1-((1S,3R,4R)-4-hydroxy-3-methoxycyclohexyl)-2-propanyl]-19,30-dimethoxy-15,17,21,23,29,35-hexamethyl-11,36-dioxa-4-azatricyclo[30.3.1.0^{4,9}]hexatriaconta-16,24,26,28-tetraene-2,3,10,14,20-pentone
- CAS Number: 53123–88–9
- PubChem CID: 5284616
- DrugBank: DB00877
- ChemSpider: 10482078
- UNII: W36ZG6FT64
- KEGG: D00753
- ChEBI: CHEBI:9168
- ChEMBL: ChEMBL413
- PDB ligand: RAP (PDBe, RCSB PDB)
- CompTox Dashboard (EPA): DTXSID5023582
- ECHA InfoCard: 100.107.147

Chemical and physical data
- Formula: C_{51}H_{79}NO_{13}
- Molar mass: 914.187 g·mol^{−1}
- 3D model (JSmol): Interactive image
- Solubility in water: 0.0026
- SMILES: O[C@@H]1CC[C@H](C[C@H]1OC)C[C@@H](C)[C@@H]4CC(=O)[C@H](C)/C=C(\C)[C@@H](O)[C@@H](OC)C(=O)[C@H](C)C[C@H](C)\C=C\C=C\C=C(/C)[C@@H](OC)C[C@@H]2CC[C@@H](C)[C@@](O)(O2)C(=O)C(=O)N3CCCC[C@H]3C(=O)O4
- InChI: InChI=1S/C51H79NO13/c1-30-16-12-11-13-17-31(2)42(61-8)28-38-21-19-36(7)51(60,65-38)48(57)49(58)52-23-15-14-18-39(52)50(59)64-43(33(4)26-37-20-22-40(53)44(27-37)62-9)29-41(54)32(3)25-35(6)46(56)47(63-10)45(55)34(5)24-30/h11-13,16-17,25,30,32-34,36-40,42-44,46-47,53,56,60H,14-15,18-24,26-29H2,1-10H3/b13-11+,16-12+,31-17+,35-25+/t30-,32-,33-,34-,36-,37+,38+,39+,40-,42+,43+,44-,46-,47+,51-/m1/s1; Key:QFJCIRLUMZQUOT-HPLJOQBZSA-N

Sirolimus, also known as rapamycin and sold under the brand name Rapamune among others, is a macrolide compound that is used to coat coronary stents, prevent organ transplant rejection, treat a rare lung disease called lymphangioleiomyomatosis, and treat perivascular epithelioid cell tumour (PEComa). It has immunosuppressant functions in humans and is especially useful in preventing the rejection of kidney transplants. It is a mammalian target of rapamycin (mTOR) kinase inhibitor that reduces the sensitivity of T cells and B cells to interleukin-2 (IL-2), inhibiting their activity.

This compound also has a use in cardiovascular drug-eluting stent technologies to inhibit restenosis.

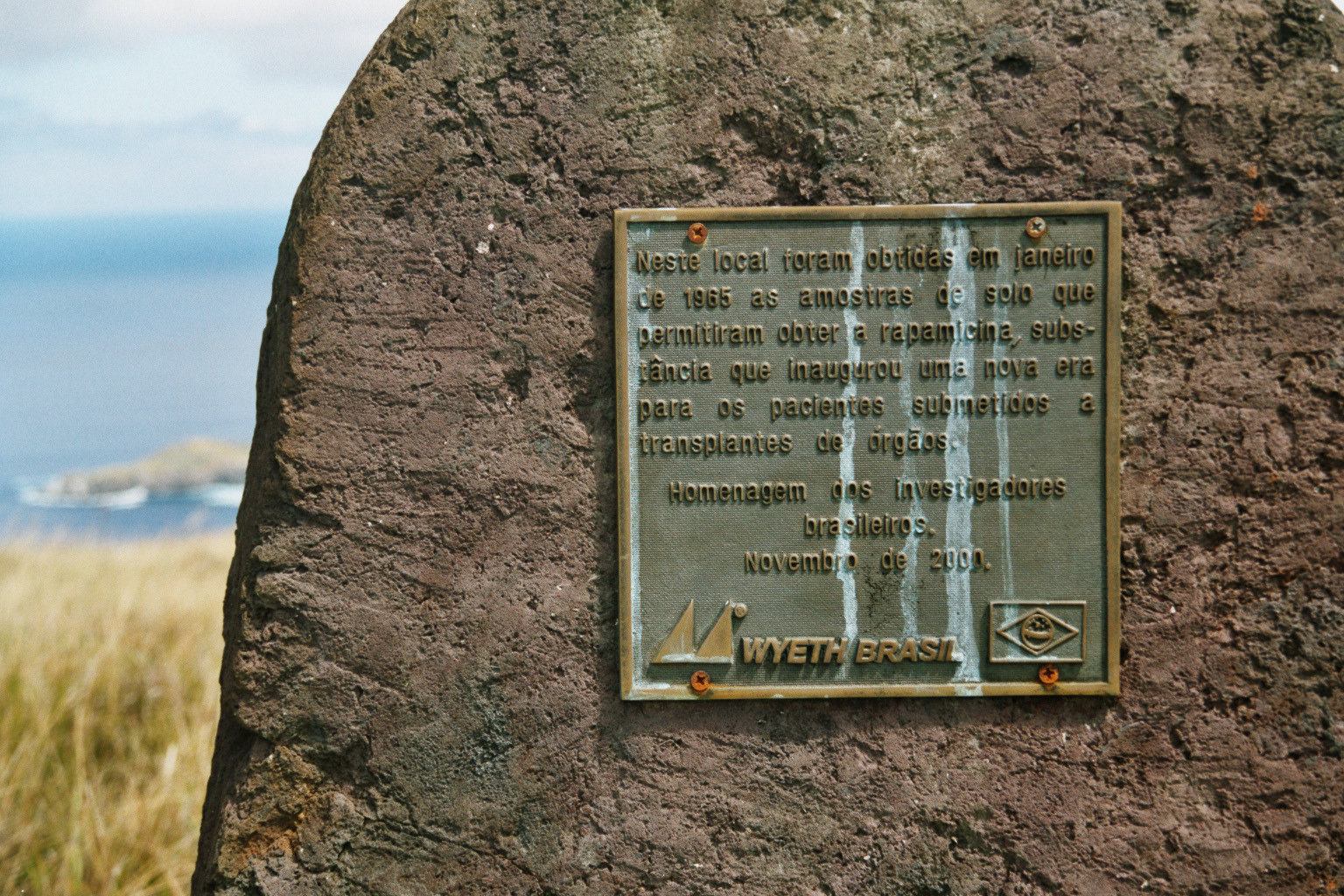
A plaque, written in Portuguese, commemorating the discovery of sirolimus on Easter Island, near Rano Kau

It is produced by the bacterium Streptomyces hygroscopicus and was isolated for the first time in 1972, from samples of S. hygroscopicus found on Easter Island. The compound was originally named rapamycin after the native name of the island, Rapa Nui. Sirolimus was initially developed as an antifungal agent. However, this use was abandoned when it was discovered to have potent immunosuppressive and antiproliferative properties due to its ability to inhibit mTOR. It was approved by the US Food and Drug Administration (FDA) in 1999. Hyftor (sirolimus gel) was authorized for topical treatment of facial angiofibroma in the European Union in May 2023.

== Medical uses ==
In the US, sirolimus, as Rapamune, is indicated for the prevention of organ transplant rejection and for the treatment of lymphangioleiomyomatosis; and, as Fyarro, in the form of protein-bound particles, for the treatment of adults with locally advanced unresectable or metastatic malignant perivascular epithelioid cell tumour (PEComa).

In the EU, sirolimus, as Rapamune, is indicated for the prophylaxis of organ rejection in adults at low to moderate immunological risk receiving a renal transplant and for the treatment of people with sporadic lymphangioleiomyomatosis with moderate lung disease or declining lung function; and, as Hyftor, for the treatment of facial angiofibroma associated with tuberous sclerosis complex.

=== Prevention of transplant rejection ===
The chief advantage sirolimus has over calcineurin inhibitors is its low toxicity toward kidneys. Transplant patients maintained on calcineurin inhibitors long-term tend to develop impaired kidney function or even kidney failure; this can be avoided by using sirolimus instead. It is particularly advantageous in patients with kidney transplants for hemolytic–uremic syndrome, as this disease is likely to recur in the transplanted kidney if a calcineurin-inhibitor is used. However, on 7 October 2008, the FDA approved safety labeling revisions for sirolimus to warn of the risk for decreased renal function associated with its use. In 2009, the FDA notified healthcare professionals that a clinical trial conducted by Wyeth showed an increased mortality in stable liver transplant patients after switching from a calcineurin inhibitor-based immunosuppressive regimen to sirolimus. A 2019 cohort study of nearly 10,000 lung transplant recipients in the US demonstrated significantly improved long-term survival using sirolimus + tacrolimus instead of mycophenolate mofetil + tacrolimus for immunosuppressive therapy starting at one year after transplant.

Sirolimus can also be used either alone or in conjunction with a calcineurin inhibitor (such as tacrolimus) or mycophenolate mofetil, or both, to provide steroid-free immunosuppression regimens. Impaired wound healing and thrombocytopenia are possible side effects of sirolimus; therefore, some transplant centers prefer not to use it immediately after the transplant operation, but instead administer it only after a period of weeks or months. Its optimal role in immunosuppression has not yet been determined, and it remains the subject of a number of ongoing clinical trials.

=== Lymphangioleiomyomatosis ===
In May 2015, the FDA approved sirolimus to treat lymphangioleiomyomatosis (LAM), a rare, progressive lung disease that primarily affects women of childbearing age. This made sirolimus the first drug approved to treat this disease. LAM involves lung tissue infiltration with smooth muscle-like cells with mutations of the tuberous sclerosis complex gene (TSC2). Loss of TSC2 gene function activates the mTOR signaling pathway, resulting in the release of lymphangiogenic growth factors. Sirolimus blocks this pathway.

The safety and efficacy of sirolimus treatment of LAM were investigated in clinical trials that compared sirolimus treatment with a placebo group in 89 patients for 12 months. The patients were observed for 12 months after the treatment had ended. The most commonly reported side effects of sirolimus treatment of LAM were mouth and lip ulcers, diarrhea, abdominal pain, nausea, sore throat, acne, chest pain, leg swelling, upper respiratory tract infection, headache, dizziness, muscle pain and elevated cholesterol. Serious side effects including hypersensitivity and swelling (edema) have been observed in renal transplant patients.

While sirolimus was considered for treatment of LAM, it received orphan drug designation status because LAM is a rare condition.

The safety of LAM treatment by sirolimus in people younger than 18 years old has not been tested.

=== Coronary stent coating ===
The antiproliferative effect of sirolimus has also been used in conjunction with coronary stents to prevent restenosis in coronary arteries following balloon angioplasty. The sirolimus is formulated in a polymer coating that affords controlled release through the healing period following coronary intervention. Several large clinical studies have demonstrated lower restenosis rates in patients treated with sirolimus-eluting stents when compared to bare-metal stents, resulting in fewer repeat procedures. However, this kind of stent may also increase the risk of vascular thrombosis.

=== Vascular malformations ===
Sirolimus is used to treat vascular malformations. Treatment with sirolimus can decrease pain and the fullness of vascular malformations, improve coagulation levels, and slow the growth of abnormal lymphatic vessels. Sirolimus is a relatively new medical therapy for the treatment of vascular malformations in recent years, sirolimus has emerged as a new medical treatment option for both vascular tumors and vascular malformations, as a mammalian target of rapamycin (mTOR), capable of integrating signals from the PI3K/AKT pathway to coordinate proper cell growth and proliferation. Hence, sirolimus is ideal for "proliferative" vascular tumors through the control of tissue overgrowth disorders caused by inappropriate activation of the PI3K/AKT/mTOR pathway as an antiproliferative agent.

=== Angiofibromas ===
Sirolimus has been used as a topical treatment of angiofibromas with tuberous sclerosis complex (TSC). Facial angiofibromas occur in 80% of patients with TSC, and the condition is very disfiguring. A retrospective review of English-language medical publications reporting on topical sirolimus treatment of facial angiofibromas found sixteen separate studies with positive patient outcomes after using the drug. The reports involved a total of 84 patients, and improvement was observed in 94% of subjects, especially if treatment began during the early stages of the disease. Sirolimus treatment was applied in several different formulations (ointment, gel, solution, and cream), ranging from 0.003 to 1% concentrations. Reported adverse effects included one case of perioral dermatitis, one case of cephalea, and four cases of irritation.

In April 2022, sirolimus was approved by the FDA for treating angiofibromas.

== Adverse effects ==
The most common adverse reactions (≥30% occurrence, leading to a 5% treatment discontinuation rate) observed with sirolimus in clinical studies of organ rejection prophylaxis in individuals with kidney transplants include: peripheral edema, hypercholesterolemia, abdominal pain, headache, nausea, diarrhea, pain, constipation, hypertriglyceridemia, hypertension, increased creatinine, fever, urinary tract infection, anemia, arthralgia, and thrombocytopenia.

The most common adverse reactions (≥20% occurrence, leading to an 11% treatment discontinuation rate) observed with sirolimus in clinical studies for the treatment of lymphangioleiomyomatosis are: peripheral edema, hypercholesterolemia, abdominal pain, headache, nausea, diarrhea, chest pain, stomatitis, nasopharyngitis, acne, upper respiratory tract infection, dizziness, and myalgia.

The following adverse effects occurred in 3–20% of individuals taking sirolimus for organ rejection prophylaxis following a kidney transplant:

System	Adverse effects
Body as a whole	Sepsis, lymphocele, herpes zoster infection, herpes simplex infection
Cardiovascular	Venous thromboembolism (pulmonary embolism and deep venous thrombosis), rapid heart rate
Digestive	Stomatitis
Hematologic/lymphatic	Thrombotic thrombocytopenic purpura/hemolytic uremic syndrome (TTP/HUS), leukopenia
Metabolic	Abnormal healing, increased lactic dehydrogenase (LDH), hypokalemia, diabetes
Musculoskeletal	Bone necrosis
Respiratory	Pneumonia, epistaxis
Skin	Melanoma, squamous cell carcinoma, basal cell carcinoma
Urogenital	Pyelonephritis, ovarian cysts, menstrual disorders (amenorrhea and menorrhagia)

=== Diabetes-like symptoms ===
While sirolimus inhibition of mTORC1 appears to mediate the drug's benefits, it also inhibits mTORC2, which results in diabetes-like symptoms. This includes decreased glucose tolerance and insensitivity to insulin. Sirolimus treatment may additionally increase the risk of type 2 diabetes. In mouse studies, these symptoms can be avoided through the use of alternate dosing regimens or analogs such as everolimus or temsirolimus.

=== Lung toxicity ===
Pulmonary toxicity, or toxicity to lungs, is a serious complication associated with sirolimus therapy, especially in the case of lung transplants. The mechanism of the interstitial pneumonitis caused by sirolimus and other macrolide mTOR inhibitors is unclear, and may have nothing to do with the mTOR pathway. The interstitial pneumonitis is not dose-dependent, but is more common in patients with underlying lung disease.

=== Lowered effectiveness of immune system ===
There have been warnings about the use of sirolimus in transplants, where it may increase mortality due to an increased risk of infections.

=== Cancer risk ===
Sirolimus may increase an individual's risk for contracting skin cancers from exposure to sunlight or UV radiation, and risk of developing lymphoma. In studies, the skin cancer risk under sirolimus was lower than under other immunosuppressants such as azathioprine and calcineurin inhibitors, and lower than under placebo.

=== Impaired wound healing ===
Individuals taking sirolimus are at increased risk of experiencing impaired or delayed wound healing, particularly if they have a body mass index more than 30 kg/m^{2} (classified as obese).

== Interactions ==
Sirolimus is metabolized by the CYP3A4 enzyme and is a substrate of the P-glycoprotein (P-gp) efflux pump; hence, inhibitors of either protein may increase sirolimus concentrations in blood plasma, whereas inducers of CYP3A4 and P-gp may decrease sirolimus concentrations in blood plasma.

== Pharmacology ==
=== Pharmacodynamics ===
Unlike the similarly named tacrolimus, sirolimus is not a calcineurin inhibitor, but it has a similar suppressive effect on the immune system. Sirolimus inhibits IL-2 and other cytokine receptor-dependent signal transduction mechanisms, via action on mTOR (mammalian target of rapamycin, rapamycin being another name for sirolimus), and thereby blocks activation of T and B cells. Ciclosporin and tacrolimus inhibit the secretion of IL-2, by inhibiting calcineurin.

The mode of action of sirolimus is to bind the cytosolic protein FK-binding protein 12 (FKBP12) like tacrolimus. Unlike the tacrolimus-FKBP12 complex, which inhibits calcineurin (PP2B), the sirolimus-FKBP12 complex inhibits the mTOR pathway by directly binding to mTOR Complex 1 (mTORC1).

mTOR has also been called FRAP (FKBP-rapamycin-associated protein), RAFT (rapamycin and FKBP target), RAPT1, or SEP. The earlier names FRAP and RAFT were coined to reflect the fact that sirolimus must bind FKBP12 first, and only the FKBP12-sirolimus complex can bind mTOR. However, mTOR is now the widely accepted name, since Tor was first discovered via genetic and molecular studies of sirolimus-resistant mutants of Saccharomyces cerevisiae that identified FKBP12, Tor1, and Tor2 as the targets of sirolimus and provided robust support that the FKBP12-sirolimus complex binds to and inhibits Tor1 and Tor2.

=== Pharmacokinetics ===
Sirolimus is metabolized primarily by the CYP3A4 enzyme (about 90%), and to a lesser degree by CYP3A5 and CYP2C8. It is also a substrate of the P-glycoprotein (P-gp) efflux pump. It has linear pharmacokinetics. In studies on N=6 and N=36 subjects, peak concentration was obtained in 1.3 hours +/r- 0.5 hours and the terminal elimination was slow, with a half life around 60 hours +/- 10 hours. Sirolimus was not found to effect the concentration of ciclosporin, which is also metabolized primarily by the CYP3A4 enzyme.

The bioavailability of sirolimus is low, and the absorption of sirolimus into the blood stream from the intestine varies widely between patients, with some patients having up to eight times more exposure than others for the same dose. Drug levels are, therefore, taken to make sure patients get the right dose for their condition. This is determined by taking a blood sample before the next dose, which gives the trough level. However, good correlation is noted between trough concentration levels and drug exposure, known as area under the concentration-time curve, for both sirolimus (SRL) and tacrolimus (TAC) (SRL: r2 = 0.83; TAC: r2 = 0.82), so only one level need be taken to know its pharmacokinetic (PK) profile. PK profiles of SRL and of TAC are unaltered by simultaneous administration. Dose-corrected drug exposure of TAC correlates with SRL (r2 = 0.8), so patients have similar bioavailability of both.

== Chemistry ==
Sirolimus is a natural product and macrocyclic lactone.

=== Biosynthesis ===
The biosynthesis of the rapamycin core is accomplished by a type I polyketide synthase (PKS) in conjunction with a nonribosomal peptide synthetase (NRPS). The domains responsible for the biosynthesis of the linear polyketide of rapamycin are organized into three multienzymes, RapA, RapB, and RapC, which contain a total of 14 modules (figure 1). The three multienzymes are organized such that the first four modules of polyketide chain elongation are in RapA, the following six modules for continued elongation are in RapB, and the final four modules to complete the biosynthesis of the linear polyketide are in RapC. Then, the linear polyketide is modified by the NRPS, RapP, which attaches L-pipecolate to the terminal end of the polyketide, and then cyclizes the molecule, yielding the unbound product, prerapamycin.

Figure 1: Domain organization of PKS of rapamycin and biosynthetic intermediates

Figure 2: Prerapamycin, unbound product of PKS and NRPS

Figure 3: Sequence of "tailoring" steps, which convert unbound prerapamycin into rapamycin

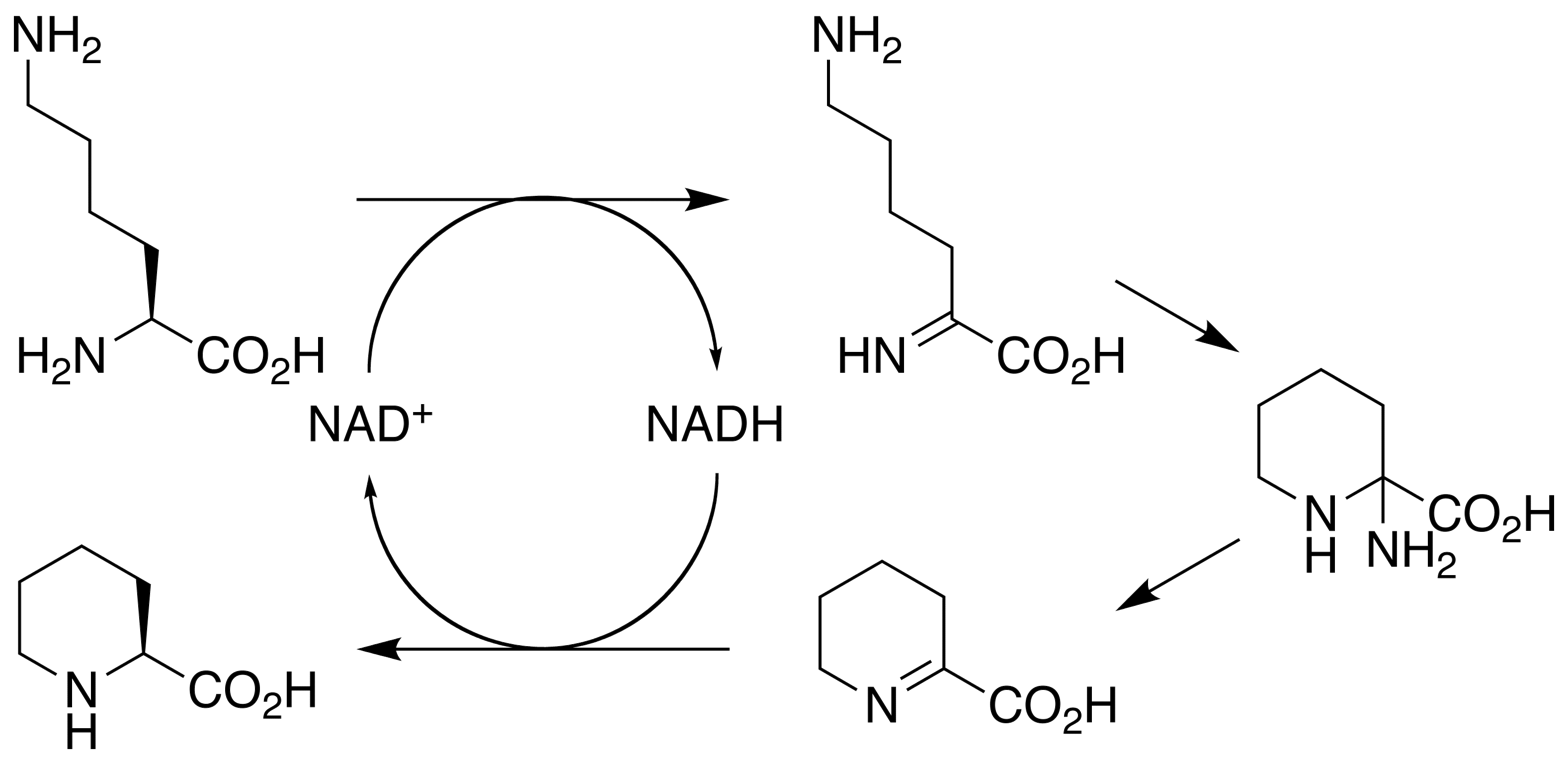
Figure 4: Proposed mechanism of lysine cyclodeaminase conversion of L-lysine to L-pipecolic acid

The core macrocycle, prerapamycin (figure 2), is then modified (figure 3) by an additional five enzymes, which lead to the final product, rapamycin. First, the core macrocycle is modified by RapI, SAM-dependent O-methyltransferase (MTase), which O-methylates at C39. Next, a carbonyl is installed at C9 by RapJ, a cytochrome P-450 monooxygenases (P-450). Then, RapM, another MTase, O-methylates at C16. Finally, RapN, another P-450, installs a hydroxyl at C27 immediately followed by O-methylation by Rap Q, a distinct MTase, at C27 to yield rapamycin.

The biosynthetic genes responsible for rapamycin synthesis have been identified. As expected, three extremely large open reading frames (ORF's) designated as rapA, rapB, and rapC encode for three extremely large and complex multienzymes, RapA, RapB, and RapC, respectively. The gene rapL has been established to code for a NAD+-dependent lysine cycloamidase, which converts L-lysine to L-pipecolic acid (figure 4) for incorporation at the end of the polyketide. The gene rapP, which is embedded between the PKS genes and translationally coupled to rapC, encodes for an additional enzyme, an NPRS responsible for incorporating L-pipecolic acid, chain termination and cyclization of prerapamycin. In addition, genes rapI, rapJ, rapM, rapN, rapO, and rapQ have been identified as coding for tailoring enzymes that modify the macrocyclic core to give rapamycin (figure 3). Finally, rapG and rapH have been identified to code for enzymes that have a positive regulatory role in the preparation of rapamycin through the control of rapamycin PKS gene expression. Biosynthesis of this 31-membered macrocycle begins as the loading domain is primed with the starter unit, 4,5-dihydroxocyclohex-1-ene-carboxylic acid, which is derived from the shikimate pathway. Note that the cyclohexane ring of the starting unit is reduced during the transfer to module 1. The starting unit is then modified by a series of Claisen condensations with malonyl or methylmalonyl substrates, which are attached to an acyl carrier protein (ACP) and extend the polyketide by two carbons each. After each successive condensation, the growing polyketide is further modified according to enzymatic domains that are present to reduce and dehydrate it, thereby introducing the diversity of functionalities observed in rapamycin (figure 1). Once the linear polyketide is complete, L-pipecolic acid, which is synthesized by a lysine cycloamidase from an L-lysine, is added to the terminal end of the polyketide by an NRPS. Then, the NSPS cyclizes the polyketide, giving prerapamycin, the first enzyme-free product. The macrocyclic core is then customized by a series of post-PKS enzymes through methylations by MTases and oxidations by P-450s to yield rapamycin.

== Society and culture ==
=== Legal status ===
In February 2023, the Committee for Medicinal Products for Human Use of the European Medicines Agency adopted a positive opinion, recommending the granting of a marketing authorization for the medicinal product Hyftor, intended for the treatment of angiofibroma. The applicant for this medicinal product is Plusultra pharma GmbH. Hyftor was authorized for medical use in the European Union in May 2023.

Sirolimus, as Rapamune solution, was approved for medical use in the United States in 1999; and as Rapamune tablets in August 2000.

Sirolimus, as Fyarro, was approved for medical use in the United States in November 2021.

Sirolimus, as Hyftor, was approved for medical use in the United States in March 2022.

== Research ==
=== Cancer ===
The antiproliferative effects of sirolimus may have a role in treating cancer. When dosed appropriately, sirolimus can enhance the immune response to tumor targeting or otherwise promote tumor regression in clinical trials. Sirolimus seems to lower the cancer risk in some transplant patients.

Sirolimus was shown to inhibit the progression of dermal Kaposi's sarcoma in patients with renal transplants. Other mTOR inhibitors, such as temsirolimus (CCI-779) or everolimus (RAD001), are being tested for use in cancers such as glioblastoma multiforme and mantle cell lymphoma. However, these drugs have a higher rate of fatal adverse events in cancer patients than control drugs.

A combination therapy of doxorubicin and sirolimus has been shown to drive Akt-positive lymphomas into remission in mice. Akt signalling promotes cell survival in Akt-positive lymphomas and acts to prevent the cytotoxic effects of chemotherapy drugs, such as doxorubicin or cyclophosphamide. Sirolimus blocks Akt signalling and the cells lose their resistance to the chemotherapy. Bcl-2-positive lymphomas were completely resistant to the therapy; eIF4E-expressing lymphomas are not sensitive to sirolimus.

=== Tuberous sclerosis complex ===
Sirolimus also shows promise in treating tuberous sclerosis complex (TSC), a congenital disorder that predisposes those afflicted to benign tumor growth in the brain, heart, kidneys, skin, and other organs. After several studies conclusively linked mTOR inhibitors to remission in TSC tumors, specifically subependymal giant-cell astrocytomas in children and angiomyolipomas in adults, many US doctors began prescribing sirolimus (Wyeth's Rapamune) and everolimus (Novartis's RAD001) to TSC patients off-label. Numerous clinical trials using both rapamycin analogs, involving both children and adults with TSC, are underway in the United States.

=== Effects on longevity ===
mTOR, specifically mTORC1, was first shown to be important in aging in 2003, in a study on worms; sirolimus was shown to inhibit and slow aging in worms, yeast, and flies, and then to improve the condition of mouse models of various diseases of aging. Sirolimus was first shown to extend lifespan in wild-type mice in a study published by NIH investigators in 2009; the studies have been replicated in mice of many different genetic backgrounds. A study published in 2020 found late-life sirolimus dosing schedules enhanced mouse lifespan in a sex-specific manner: limited rapamycin exposure enhanced male but not female lifespan, providing evidence for sex differences in sirolimus response. The results are further supported by the finding that genetically modified mice with impaired mTORC1 signalling live longer.

Sirolimus has potential for widespread use as a longevity-promoting drug, with evidence pointing to its ability to prevent age-associated decline of cognitive and physical health. In 2014, researchers at Novartis showed that a related compound, everolimus, increased elderly patients' immune response on an intermittent dose. This led to many in the anti-aging community self-experimenting with the compound. However, because of the different biochemical properties of sirolimus, the dosing is potentially very different from that of everolimus. Ultimately, due to known side-effects of sirolimus, as well as inadequate evidence for optimal dosing, it was concluded in 2016 that more research was required before sirolimus could be widely prescribed for this purpose. Two human studies on the effects of sirolimus (rapamycin) on longevity did not show statistically significant benefits. However, due to limitations in the studies, further research is needed to fully assess its potential in humans.

Sirolimus has complex effects on the immune system—while IL-12 goes up and IL-10 decreases, which suggests an immunostimulatory response, TNF and IL-6 are decreased, which suggests an immunosuppressive response. The duration of the inhibition and the exact extent to which mTORC1 and mTORC2 are inhibited play a role, but were not yet well understood according to a 2015 paper.

=== Topical administration ===
When applied as a topical preparation, researchers showed that rapamycin can regenerate collagen and reverse clinical signs of aging in elderly patients. The concentrations are far lower than those used to treat angiofibromas.

=== SARS-CoV-2 ===
Rapamycin has been proposed as a treatment for severe acute respiratory syndrome coronavirus 2 insofar as its immunosuppressive effects could prevent or reduce the cytokine storm seen in very serious cases of COVID-19. Moreover, inhibition of cell proliferation by rapamycin could reduce viral replication. As of 2026, low dose Rapamycin is in clinical trials for long COVID which may have autoimmune qualities.

=== Atherosclerosis ===
Rapamycin can accelerate degradation of oxidized LDL cholesterol in endothelial cells, thereby lowering the risk of atherosclerosis. Oxidized LDL cholesterol is a major contributor to atherosclerosis.

=== Lupus ===
As of 2016, studies in cells, animals, and humans have suggested that mTOR activation is a process underlying systemic lupus erythematosus and that inhibiting mTOR with rapamycin may be a disease-modifying treatment. As of 2016 rapamycin had been tested in small clinical trials in people with lupus.

=== Lymphatic malformation (LM) ===
Lymphatic malformation, lymphangioma or cystic hygroma, is an abnormal growth of lymphatic vessels that usually affects children around the head and neck area and more rarely involving the tongue causing macroglossia. LM is caused by a PIK3CA mutation during lymphangiogenesis early in gestational cell formation causing the malformation of lymphatic tissue. Treatment often consists of removal of the affected tissue via excision, laser ablation or sclerotherapy, but the rate of recurrence can be high and surgery can have complications. Sirolimus has shown evidence of being an effective treatment in alleviating symptoms and reducing the size of the malformation by way of altering the mTOR pathway in lymphangiogenesis. Although an off label use of the drug, Sirolimus has been shown to be an effective treatment for both microcystic and macrocystic LM. More research is however needed to develop and create targeted, effective treatment therapies for LM.

=== Graft-versus-host disease ===
Due to its immunosuppressant activity, rapamycin has been assessed as prophylaxis or treatment agent of graft-versus-host disease (GVHD), a complication of hematopoietic stem cell transplantation. While contrasted results were obtained in clinical trials, pre-clinical studies have shown that rapamycin can mitigate GVHD by increasing the proliferation of regulatory T cells, inhibiting cytotoxic T cells and lowering the differentiation of effector T cells.

=== Applications in biology research ===
Rapamycin is used in biology research as an agent for chemically induced dimerization. In this application, rapamycin is added to cells expressing two fusion constructs, one of which contains the rapamycin-binding FRB domain from mTOR and the other of which contains an FKBP domain. Each fusion protein also contains additional domains that are brought into proximity when rapamycin induces binding of FRB and FKBP. In this way, rapamycin can be used to control and study protein localization and interactions.

=== Neurodegenerative disorders ===
As suppression of autophagy has been indicated as a contributing factor in a variety of neurodegenerative disorders, including Alzheimer's disease, rapamycin has been proposed as a potential treatment for these conditions, although results suggest it may not be effective in all cases.

== Veterinary uses ==
A number of veterinary medicine teaching hospitals are participating in a long-term clinical study examining the effect of rapamycin on the longevity of dogs.

A clinical trial led by NC State College of Veterinary Medicine (HALT), run at a number of veterinary hospitals across the US, found that rapamycin reverses the effects of hypertrophic cardiomyopathy in cats.

In March 2025, the US Food and Drug Administration announced conditional approval of sirolimus delayed-release tablets (Felycin-CA1) for the management of ventricular hypertrophy in cats with subclinical hypertrophic cardiomyopathy. This is the first product approved for use in cats with hypertrophic cardiomyopathy for any indication. Cardiomyopathy is a disease of the heart muscle. Hypertrophic cardiomyopathy in cats causes thickening of the heart's left ventricle. It is the most common heart disease in cats and is one of the most common causes of death in cats. While the cause is unknown in most cases, hypertrophic cardiomyopathy is associated with a genetic mutation in certain breeds, such as Maine Coons, Ragdolls, and Persians. Hypertrophic cardiomyopathy is a progressive disease. Cats in the subclinical phase have thickening of their heart wall but do not show clinical symptoms of the disease yet. Cats may live for years in the subclinical phase, while others may progress to congestive heart failure, arterial thromboembolism, or sudden death.

== See also ==
- List of drugs affected by grapefruit
