= Tuberous sclerosis protein =

tuberous sclerosis 1

Identifiers
- Symbol: TSC1
- Alt. symbols: TSC
- NCBI gene: 7248
- HGNC: 12362
- OMIM: 605284
- RefSeq: NM_000368
- UniProt: Q92574

Other data
- Locus: Chr. 9 q34
Search for
- Structures: Swiss-model
- Domains: InterPro

tuberous sclerosis 2

Identifiers
- Symbol: TSC2
- Alt. symbols: TSC4
- NCBI gene: 7249
- HGNC: 12363
- OMIM: 191092
- RefSeq: NM_000548
- UniProt: P49815

Other data
- Locus: Chr. 16 p13.3
Search for
- Structures: Swiss-model
- Domains: InterPro

Tuberous sclerosis proteins 1 and 2, also known as TSC1 (hamartin) and TSC2 (tuberin), form a protein-complex that functions as a GAP for Rheb. The complex is known as a tumor suppressor. Mutations in these genes can cause tuberous sclerosis complex. Depending on the grade of the disease, intellectual disability, epilepsy and tumors of the skin, retina, heart, kidney and the central nervous system can be symptoms.

== Physiological roles ==
The TSC1/TSC2-complex integrates environmental signals such as stress and energy status in yeast and stress, energy status and growth factors in mammals into TOR signalling. In the case of stress (DNA damage, hypoxia) or low energy availability, it is activated and regulates protein synthesis down. Growth factors lead to an inhibition of the complex and have a positive effect on protein synthesis. Defects in its genes result in less control of cell growth and may cause tuberous sclerosis or tuberous sclerosis complex (TSC). TSC is a rare genetic disease causing benign tumours to grow in the brain and on other vital organs. A combination of symptoms may include seizures, developmental delay, behavioural problems, skin abnormalities, lung and kidney disease.

== Regulation ==
The TSC1 and TSC2 proteins form a heterodimeric complex which acts as an important integrator of different signaling pathways controlling mTOR signaling, by regulating especially mTORC1 activity. TSC2 contains a GTPase Activating Protein (GAP) domain for Rheb, thus reducing the activator function of Rheb for mTORC1. TSC1 does not have a GAP domain but it acts as a stabilizer of TSC2 by protecting it from degradation. The activity of the TSC1-TSC2 complex is regulated by phosphorylation of different Ser and Thr sites mediated by the following Pathways:

- PI3K-AKT signalling: AKT inhibits TSC1-TSC2 by phosphorylating TSC2 on 2-5 sites. However the molecular mechanism is yet unknown since the GAP activity of TSC2 is not remarkably influenced by these phosphorylation events.
- Low energy levels and stress: The AMP-dependent protein kinase AMPK phosphorylates and thereby activates TSC1-TSC2 by phosphorylating at least 2 residues of TSC2.
- Hypoxia: The Hypoxia-inducible factor α HIFα induces REDD1 at low oxygen levels. REDD1 has been shown to activate TSC1-TSC2 by neutralisation of AKT dependent inhibition.
- ERK-RSK signalling: When it is activated by ERK, RSK phosphorylates and inhibits TSC1-TSC2. TSC2 has 3 phosphorylation sites for RSK. Two of them are also substrates of AKT.

== Gene ==
The TSC1 gene is located on chromosome 9q34 and encodes the 130 kDa protein hamartin containing 1163 amino acids. The TSC2 gene is located on chromosome 16p13.3 and codes for the 200 kDa protein tuberin containing 1807 amino acids.

== Protein structure ==
The following functions of tuberin have been identified:

- GTPase-accelerating protein (GAP) function for the Rap1a GTPase.
- C-terminal transcriptional activation domains.
- Selective modulation of transcription mediated by members of the steroid receptor superfamily.
