= Streptomyces rapamycinicus =

Scientific classification
- Domain: Bacteria
- Kingdom: Bacillati
- Phylum: Actinomycetota
- Class: Actinomycetes
- Order: Streptomycetales
- Family: Streptomycetaceae
- Genus: Streptomyces
- Species: S. rapamycinicus

Binomial name
- Streptomyces rapamycinicus Kumar and Goodfellow 2008

Type strain
- ATCC 29253, NRRL 5491

Species of bacterium

Streptomyces rapamycinicus is a bacterium species from the genus of Streptomyces which has been isolated from soil from the Easter Island. Streptomyces rapamycinicus produces sirolimus.

== See also ==
- List of Streptomyces species
