= N-acetyl-β-d-glucosaminidase =

Mesophilic hydrolase

N-acetyl-β-d-glucosaminidase (EC 3.2.1.30; EC 3.2.1.52) is a mesophilic hydrolase that specifically hydrolyzes N-acetyl-glucosides. The enzyme is found across a wide variety of marine and terrestrial creatures with the primary function of breaking down oligosaccharides in the presence of water. One of the primary functions of the enzyme is to target and hydrolyze oligosaccharides containing chitin. In this chitinase function, the enzyme contributes to the ability of many organisms to break down chitin-containing molecules and subsequently digest or re-uptake environmental chitin, carbon, or nitrogen. The enzyme's crystal structure varies slightly across organisms, but is characterized by three or four domains with one active site. Across proteins, the active site entails an α-β barrel with either an arginine or tryptophan residues in the barrel pocket to bind incoming substrate.

== Enzyme Commission (EC) nomenclature ==
N-acetyl-β-d-glucosaminidase is often referred to under one of two EC numbers, depending on the synonym used in the literature. EC 3.2.1.30 refers to the single n-acetyl-β-d-glucosaminidase enzyme, which is one of four in a larger enzyme complex. EC 3.2.1.52 refer to β-n-acetyl-hexosaminidase, a complex of 4 enzymes including n-acetyl-β-d-glucosaminidase.

=== EC number meaning ===
The various numbers in the EC sequence describe the enzyme function in ascending order of specificity:

- EC 3. refers to a hydrolase: an enzyme that catalyzes hydrolysis, or a decomposition reaction with water as one of the reactants.
- EC 3.2 refers to a glycosylase: an enzyme that specifically hydrolyses glycosyl compounds.
- EC 3.2.1 refers to a glycosidase: an enzyme that hydrolyses oxygen- and sulfur-glycosol compounds.
- EC 3.2.1.30 refers to n-acetyl-β-d-glucosaminidase: an enzyme that hydrolyses N-acetyl-glucosides.
- EC 3.2.1.52 refers to β-n-acetyl-hexosaminidase, a 4-enzyme family that has the ability to hydrolyze terminal non-reducing n-acetyl-hexosamine residues (n-acetyl-glucosides and n-acetyl-galactosides).

=== Synonyms ===
In addition to its EC numbers, n-acetyl-β-d-glucosaminidase can be referred by several synonyms in the literature. These include:

- β-n-acetylglucosaminidase
- β-acetylaminodeoxyglucosidase
- β-acetamidodeoxyglucosidase
- β-acetylglucosaminidase
- n-acetyl-β-glucosaminidase
- n-acetyl-β-d-glucosaminidase
- chitobiase
- acetyl-β-glucosaminidase
- β-d-glucosaminidase
- β-n-acetyl-d-glucosaminidase
- β-n-acetylaminodeoxyglucosidase
- exo-n-acetyl-β-d-glucosaminidase
- p-nitrophenyl-β-n-acetylglucosaminidase
- exochitinase
- β-d-n-acetylglucosaminidase

== Reaction pathways ==
The general reaction structure occurs where, in the presence of water, n-acetyl-β-d-glucosaminidase breaks oligosaccharides into smaller sugar units. More specifically, n-acetyl-β-d-glucosaminidase hydrolyses terminal non-reducing n-acetyl-β-glucosamine residues in chitin molecules (ie chitobiose, chitotriose) and in glycoproteins. Bonds broken during hydrolysis include the β-glycosidic bonds of β-glucosaminide and β-galactosiminide, and specific monosaccharide products include N-acetyl-d-glucosamine and N-acetyl-d-galactosamine. N-acetyl-β-d-glucosaminidase has also been observed to catalyze transglycosylation, which in turn facilitates the creation of new oligosaccharides with different amino residues. Furthermore, n-acetyl-β-d-glucosaminidase is believed to rely on the given substrate to provide the nucleophile needed to instigate hydrolysis.

=== Common substrates ===
Common substrates utilized in reactions with n-acetyl-β-d-glucosaminidase include:

- p-nitrophenyl-2-acetamido-2-deoxy-β-d-glucopyranoside and H_{2}O
- p-nitrophenyl-2-acetamido-2-deoxy-β-d-galactopyranoside and H_{2}O
- n, n'-diacetylchitobiose and H_{2}O
- 4-methylumbelliferyl-β-d-glucosaminide (or galactoaminide) and H_{2}O

=== Common products ===
Common products formed in reactions with n-acetyl-β-d-glucosaminidase include:

- n-acetylglucosamine and p-nitrophenol
- n-acetylgalactosamine and p-nitrophenol
- n-acetylglucosamine
- 4-methylumbelliferone and n-acetylglucosamine

=== K_{m} ===
The K_{m} of n-acetyl-β-d-glucosaminidase has been reported at values ranging from 0.096 mM in marine fungi to 0.27 mM in Aeromonas sp. for the hydrolysis of p-nitrophenyl-β-d-n-acetylglucosaminide. The same reaction catalyzed by proteins isolated from calf brain was generated at an observed K_{m} of 0.72 mM, with a maximum reaction velocity of 2.5 μmoles/mg per hour.

=== Inhibitors ===
==== Product saturation ====
One means by which n-acetyl-β-d-glucosaminidase reactions are inhibited is by increased saturation of reaction product. Hydrolysis of oligosaccharides (ie, chitobiose and chitotriose) to mono- and disaccharides decreases in rate as substrate polymerization level increase (i.e., for chitooligosaccharides with degrees of polymerization between 5 and 8). Similarly, increased concentrations of monosaccharides (N-acetyl-D-glucosamine, glucose, galactose) in the reaction solution can decrease activity by 12-70%.

==== Ionic inhibitors ====
Multiple ions have been identified as inhibiting n-acetyl-β-d-glucosaminidase activity. These include:

- Ag^{+}
- Cu^{2+}
- Hg^{2+}
- Zn^{2+}
- Fe^{3+}
- Ca^{2+}
- Cd^{2+}

==== Other inhibitors ====
Other molecular compounds have been observed to depress n-acetyl-β-d-glucosaminidase activity. These include:

- CaCl_{2}
- MgSO_{4}
- 2-deoxy-2-acetamido-d-glucono-1
- 5-lactone
- iodeacetamide
- p-chloromercuribenzoate
- p-aminophenyl-1-thio-β-L-fucopyranoside
- n-acetylmuramic acid
- acetate

== Organisms that produce and use n-acetyl-β-d-glucosaminidase ==
N-acetyl-β-d-glucosaminidase has been recorded and observed in various terrestrial and marine organisms, ranging from bacteria to megafauna. Its activity has been documented extensively in mammals, fungi, crustaceans, cartilaginous fishes, mollusks, jellyfish, and bacteria. The broader function of the enzyme within the organism is the breakdown and re-uptake of chitin molecules obtained from either external consumption in the environment or internal growth within the organism. The enzyme has also been observed to play a key role in contributing to local nitrogen levels exuded by microbial communities. Moreover, this enzyme is defined as a marker for the detection of acute kidney injury - it is present in the lysosomes of proximal tubular cells and is not filtered by the glomerulus, but is rapidly cleared from the bloodstream by the liver. Specific examples of how n-acetyl-β-d-glucosaminidase functions within various organisms are provided in the sections below.

=== Digestion ===
In marine species that consume crustacean and/or plant materials that contain chitin, such as bonnethead sharks (Sphyrna tiburo) or Antarctic krill (Euphausia superba), n-acetyl-β-d-glucosaminidase helps breakdown chitin molecules for digestion. For Antarctic krill, the enzyme is generated within the cytosol of the organism's cells and subsequently released into the gut during digestion. In bonnethead sharks, on the other hand, the enzymes are not actually produced by the shark itself but instead by colonies of bacteria within the anterior regions of the animal's intestine. The presence of these enzymes and their function as chitinases allow bonnetheads to consume both crustaceans as well as some plant material, making them one of the few if not only omnivorous species of shark. Some species of marine bacteria, such as Vibrio furnissii, utilize n-acetyl-β-d-glucosaminidase to hydrolyze p-nitrophenol (PNP)-β-GlcNAc and 4-methylumbelliferone,7-hydroxy-4-methylcoumarin (MUF)-β-GlcNAc for further digestion. Here the enzyme plays a critical step allowing the bacteria to access nitrogen and carbon from the local marine environment.

=== Shell maintenance and molting ===
For marine organisms that have chitinous shells, such as krill or shrimp species, n-acetyl-β-d-glucosaminidase plays a prominent role in facilitating molting. In the Antarctic krill, northern krill (Meganyctiphanes norvegica), and common prawn (Palaemon serratus), the enzyme breaks terminal N-acetyl-glucosamine monomers from chitin molecules released during initial shell breakdown at the start of the molting period. During the duration of the molting periods, these monomers are continually transported by vesicles closer to the epidermis, below the newly forming shell cuticle, for reabsorption via pore channels and reutilization in the new shell post-molt.

=== Nitrogen remineralization in soils ===
When released by fungi and soil microbes, n-acetyl-β-d-glucosaminidase plays a pivotal role increasing soil nitrogen remineralization rates by breaking down chitin into amino sugars for remineralization. The activity of n-acetyl-β-d-glucosaminidase (measured in mg of p-nitrophenol per kilogram soil per hour) has been found to significantly correlate to increased total nitrogen mineralization, organic carbon production, and ammonium fixation in local environments. Because of the high levels of chitin in soil compounds globally, this ability of n-acetyl-β-d-glucosaminidase suggests that the enzyme is a key player in transitioning concentrations of nitrogen, carbon, and ammonium in soil and soil-dependent ecosystems of plants, animals, and microorganisms.

== Protein structure ==
=== Thermal and pH stability ===
N-acetyl-β-d-glucosaminidase is a mesophile, with observed structural and functional stability between 40 and 55 degrees Celsius. Maximum activity was recorded at 45 degrees Celsius. The enzyme displayed stable structure and function between 3.8 and 6.0 pH, with maximum activity at 4.5 pH and an isoelectric point (a point of no charge on the protein surface) at 4.83 pH.

=== Molecular weight ===
Measurements of the molecular weight of n-acetyl-β-d-glucosaminidase range from 68,000 g/mol (observed in proteins isolated from marine fungus, Penicillium canescens) to ~100,000 g/mol (observed in proteins isolated from Aeromonas sp.).

=== Crystal structure ===
While the structural features of n-acetyl-β-d-glucosaminidase are not well described for specific proteins isolated across the diversity of organisms it has been identified to function within, the crystal structure and active sites are well-mapped in enzymes obtained from several species of bacteria.

==== Streptococcus gordonii ====
N-acetyl-β-d-glucosaminidase isolated from Streptococcus gordonii was identified as containing 626 amino acids with a three-domain dimer structure. Each monomer within the dimer contains seven cysteine residues and no disulphide bonds. Much of the dimer surface contains hydrophobic residues. Two crystal forms have been observed, one defined by symmetric monomers and the other by asymmetric monomers. The first domain (N-terminal) contains amino residues 2-82. This domain is defined by an α-β fold containing five strands of parallel β-pleated sheet that envelop two α-helices. The second domain contains amino residues 83-400. This domain contains the active site within a triose phosphate isomerase (TIM) barrel at the C-terminal end of the domain. The mouth of the barrel is ringed by eight α-helices, and thee six loops of the barrel structure interact with the second monomer. Barrel conformation differs slightly between the symmetric and asymmetric monomer crystal forms. Lastly, the third domain contains amino residues 401-627. This domain is dominated by α-helices, with five helices adjacent to the active site barrel and in antiparallel configuration to each other.

The dual crystal forms of n-acetyl-β-d-glucosaminidase in Streptococcus gordonii are thought to facilitate the enzymes function through the configuration of active vs. dormant forms. The first crystal form is characterized by the presence of catalytic acids on the ends of the active site barrel's β-pleats, with these acids directly extending towards the inner barrel's tryptophan residues. This conformation is thought to be more favorable for directing incoming oligosaccharides into the active site for hydrolysis. In contrast, the second crystal form has multiple β-pleats turning away from the barrel and opening the active site to solvent, potentially disabling efficient hydrolysis from taking place.

==== Serratia marcescens ====
The crystal structure of n-acetyl-β-d-glucosaminidase isolated from Serratia marcescens bacteria were observed containing a single active site within the enzyme's third domain of four, characterized by an α-β barrel fold.

==== Escheria coli ====
N-acetyl-β-d-glucosaminidase cloned and sequenced from Escheria coli were linked to a gene composed of 2655 nucleotides that coded 855 amino acids to yield the final protein. For this enzyme, four domains were identified, where again, the third domain contained the active site within an eight-stranded α-β barrel fold. The first and fourth domains contain two β-pleated sheets, while the second domain is composed of both α-helices and β-pleated sheets. Similar to the crystal structure described for Streptococcus gordonii, the structures present in the enzymes for Escheria coli indicate that the substrate fits into the barrel pocket and is bound at its non-reducing terminal sugar. Unlike the active site for Streptococcus gordonii, however, the binding residue in the active site for Escheria coli is arginine rather than tryptophan. Again, the substrate is understood to provide the nucleophile needed to instigate enzyme affinity to the active site.
