= TSC1 =

Mammalian protein found in humans

Identifiers
- Aliases: TSC1, LAM, TSC, tuberous sclerosis 1, TSC complex subunit 1
- External IDs: OMIM: 605284; MGI: 1929183; GeneCards: TSC1
Available structures
PDB	Ortholog search: PDBe RCSB
PDB	List of PDB id codes 5EJC, 4Z6Y

Gene location (Human)
Chr.	Chromosome 9 (human)
Band	9q34.13	Start	132,891,348 bp
Band	9q34.13	End	132,946,874 bp

Gene location (Mouse)
Chr.	Chromosome 2 (mouse)
Band	2|2 A3	Start	28,531,240 bp
Band	2|2 A3	End	28,581,179 bp
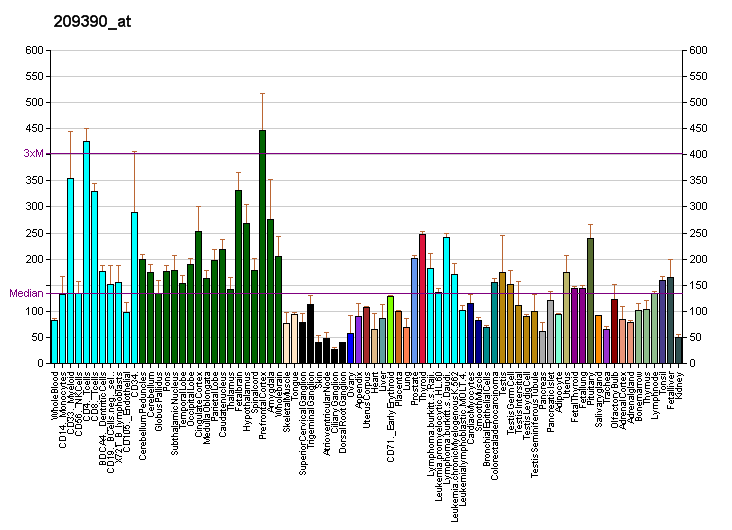
RNA expression pattern
Bgee	Human / Mouse (ortholog); Top expressed in: pars compacta; glutes; external globus pallidus; Region I of hippocampus proper; pars reticulata; lateral nuclear group of thalamus; dorsal motor nucleus of vagus nerve; inferior olivary nucleus; superior vestibular nucleus; middle temporal gyrus / Top expressed in: ventromedial nucleus; lateral hypothalamus; lateral septal nucleus; anterior amygdaloid area; supraoptic nucleus; Rostral migratory stream; paraventricular nucleus of hypothalamus; substantia nigra; mammillary body; arcuate nucleus; More reference expression data
BioGPS	More reference expression data
Gene ontology
Molecular function	chaperone binding; protein binding; protein N-terminus binding; Hsp70 protein binding; ATPase inhibitor activity; Hsp90 protein binding; GTPase activating protein binding
Cellular component	cytoplasm; cell cortex; growth cone; intracellular membrane-bounded organelle; lamellipodium; membrane; actin filament; TSC1-TSC2 complex; cytoskeleton; cytosol; nucleus; perinuclear region of cytoplasm; lipid droplet; plasma membrane; cell projection; protein-containing complex; chaperone complex; postsynaptic density
Biological process	rRNA export from nucleus; regulation of cell cycle; neural tube closure; cerebral cortex development; memory T cell differentiation; regulation of protein kinase activity; positive regulation of focal adhesion assembly; myelination; negative regulation of insulin receptor signaling pathway; synapse organization; regulation of translation; hippocampus development; regulation of phosphoprotein phosphatase activity; cell-matrix adhesion; potassium ion transport; adaptive immune response; protein heterooligomerization; kidney development; nervous system development; cell projection organization; activation of GTPase activity; regulation of focal adhesion assembly; glucose import; regulation of cell-matrix adhesion; negative regulation of cell size; response to insulin; cardiac muscle cell differentiation; negative regulation of translation; negative regulation of cell population proliferation; cellular response to oxygen-glucose deprivation; adult locomotory behavior; negative regulation of TOR signaling; regulation of neuron death; negative regulation of macroautophagy; negative regulation of neuron projection development; positive regulation of macroautophagy; negative regulation of GTPase activity; regulation of stress fiber assembly; positive regulation of stress fiber assembly; negative regulation of oxidative stress-induced neuron death; negative regulation of ATP-dependent activity; protein stabilization
Sources:Amigo / QuickGO
Orthologs
Databases	NCBI: entry; OMA: entry
Species	Human	Mouse
Entrez	7248	64930
Ensembl	ENSG00000165699	ENSMUSG00000026812
UniProt	Q92574	Q9EP53
RefSeq (mRNA)	NM_000368; NM_001008567; NM_001162426; NM_001162427; NM_001362177	NM_022887; NM_001289575; NM_001289576
RefSeq (protein)	NP_000359; NP_001155898; NP_001155899; NP_001349106	NP_001276504; NP_001276505; NP_075025
Location (UCSC)	Chr 9: 132.89 – 132.95 Mb	Chr 2: 28.53 – 28.58 Mb
PubMed search
- Wikidata
View/Edit Human	View/Edit Mouse

Tuberous sclerosis 1 (TSC1), also known as hamartin, is a protein that in humans is encoded by the TSC1 gene.

== Function ==
TSC1 functions as a co-chaperone which inhibits the ATPase activity of the chaperone Hsp90 (heat shock protein-90) and decelerates its chaperone cycle. TSC1 functions as a facilitator of Hsp90 in chaperoning the kinase and non-kinase clients including TSC2, therefore preventing their ubiquitination and degradation in the proteasome. TSC1, TSC2 and TBC1D7 is a multi-protein complex also known as the TSC complex. This complex negatively regulates mTORC1 signaling by functioning as a GTPase-activating protein (GAP) for the small GTPase Rheb, an essential activator of mTORC1. The TSC complex has been implicated as a tumor suppressor.

== Clinical significance ==
Defects in this gene can cause tuberous sclerosis, due to a functional impairment of the TSC complex. Defects in TSC1 may also be a cause of focal cortical dysplasia. TSC1 may be involved in protecting brain neurons in the CA3 region of the hippocampus from the effects of stroke.

== Interactions ==
TSC1 has been shown to interact with:

- AKT1,
- HSP70
- HSP90
- NEFL,
- PLK1, and
- TSC2.

== See also ==
- Tuberous sclerosis protein
