= TSC2 =

Mammalian protein found in Homo sapiens

Identifiers
- Aliases: TSC2, LAM, PPP1R160, TSC4, tuberous sclerosis 2, TSC complex subunit 2
- External IDs: OMIM: 191092; MGI: 102548; GeneCards: TSC2

Gene location (Human)
Chr.	Chromosome 16 (human)
Band	16p13.3	Start	2,047,967 bp
Band	16p13.3	End	2,089,491 bp

Gene location (Mouse)
Chr.	Chromosome 17 (mouse)
Band	17 A3.3|17 12.41 cM	Start	24,814,790 bp
Band	17 A3.3|17 12.41 cM	End	24,851,604 bp
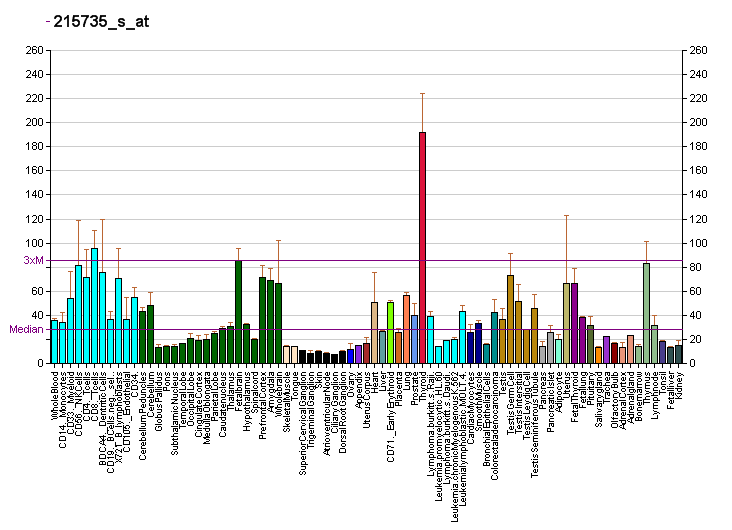
RNA expression pattern
Bgee	Human / Mouse (ortholog); Top expressed in: right hemisphere of cerebellum; anterior pituitary; right uterine tube; right lobe of thyroid gland; sural nerve; left lobe of thyroid gland; right testis; left testis; right frontal lobe; left ovary / Top expressed in: tail of embryo; genital tubercle; superior frontal gyrus; dentate gyrus of hippocampal formation granule cell; primary visual cortex; neural layer of retina; muscle of thigh; cardiac muscle tissue of left ventricle; ventricular zone; CA3 field; More reference expression data
BioGPS	More reference expression data
Gene ontology
Molecular function	phosphatase binding; protein homodimerization activity; GTPase activator activity; small GTPase binding; protein binding; Hsp90 protein binding
Cellular component	cytoplasm; cytosol; Golgi apparatus; membrane; TSC1-TSC2 complex; perinuclear region of cytoplasm; lysosome; nucleus; postsynaptic density
Biological process	regulation of endocytosis; protein localization; insulin-like growth factor receptor signaling pathway; negative regulation of protein kinase B signaling; endocytosis; protein import into nucleus; negative regulation of protein kinase activity; negative regulation of Wnt signaling pathway; negative regulation of phosphatidylinositol 3-kinase signaling; regulation of cell cycle; development of the heart; positive regulation of GTPase activity; neural tube closure; negative regulation of insulin receptor signaling pathway; positive chemotaxis; viral process; regulation of small GTPase mediated signal transduction; vesicle-mediated transport; negative regulation of cell population proliferation; regulation of insulin receptor signaling pathway; positive regulation of macroautophagy; anoikis; negative regulation of mitophagy; negative regulation of TOR signaling; protein kinase B signaling
Sources:Amigo / QuickGO
Orthologs
Databases	NCBI: entry; OMA: entry
Species	Human	Mouse
Entrez	7249	22084
Ensembl	ENSG00000103197	ENSMUSG00000002496
UniProt	P49815	Q61037
RefSeq (mRNA)	NM_000548; NM_001077183; NM_001114382; NM_021055; NM_021056 NM_001318827; NM_001318829; NM_001318831; NM_001318832; NM_001363528; NM_001370404; NM_001370405	NM_001039363; NM_001286713; NM_001286714; NM_001286716; NM_001286718 NM_001286720; NM_011647
RefSeq (protein)	NP_000539; NP_001070651; NP_001107854; NP_001305756; NP_001305758 NP_001305760; NP_001305761; NP_066399; NP_001350457; NP_001357333; NP_001357334	n/a
Location (UCSC)	Chr 16: 2.05 – 2.09 Mb	Chr 17: 24.81 – 24.85 Mb
PubMed search
- Wikidata
View/Edit Human	View/Edit Mouse

Tuberous sclerosis complex 2 (TSC2), also known as tuberin, is a protein that in humans is encoded by the TSC2 gene.

== Function ==
Mutations in this gene lead to tuberous sclerosis. Its gene product is believed to be a tumor suppressor and is able to stimulate specific GTPases. Hamartin coded by the gene TSC1 functions as a facilitator of Hsp90 in chaperoning of tuberin, therefore preventing its ubiquitination and degradation in the proteasome. Alternative splicing results in multiple transcript variants encoding different isoforms of the protein. Mutations in TSC2 can cause lymphangioleiomyomatosis, a disease caused by the enlargement of tissue in the lungs, creating cysts and tumours and causing difficulty breathing. Because tuberin regulates cell size, along with the protein hamartin, mutations to TSC1 and TSC2 genes may prevent the control of cell growth in the lungs of individuals.

== Cell pathology ==
Cells from individuals with pathogenic mutations in the TSC2 gene display depletion of lysosomes, impairment of autophagy, and abnormal accumulation of glycogen. Defects in the autophagy-lysosome pathway are associated with excessive ubiquitination and degradation of LC3 and LAMP1/2 proteins.

== Signaling pathways ==
Pharmacological inhibition of ERK1/2 restores GSK3β activity and protein synthesis levels in a model of tuberous sclerosis.

The defective degradation of glycogen by the autophagy-lysosome pathway is, at least in part, independent of impaired regulation of mTORC1 and is restored by the combined use of PKB/Akt and mTORC1 pharmacological inhibitors.

== Interactions ==
TSC2 functions within a multi-protein complex known as the TSC complex which consists of the core proteins TSC2, TSC1, and TBC1D7.

TSC2 has been reported to interact with several other proteins that are not a part of the TSC complex including:

- AKT1,
- AXIN1,
- FOXO1,
- GSK3B,
- Hsp70
- Hsp90
- MAPK1,
- PTK2,
- PAM,
- PRKAA1,
- RAP1A,
- RHEB,
- RPS6KA1,
- UBE3A and
- YWHAZ.

== See also ==
- Tuberous sclerosis protein
