= Birt–Hogg–Dubé syndrome =

Rare autosomal dominant cancer syndrome

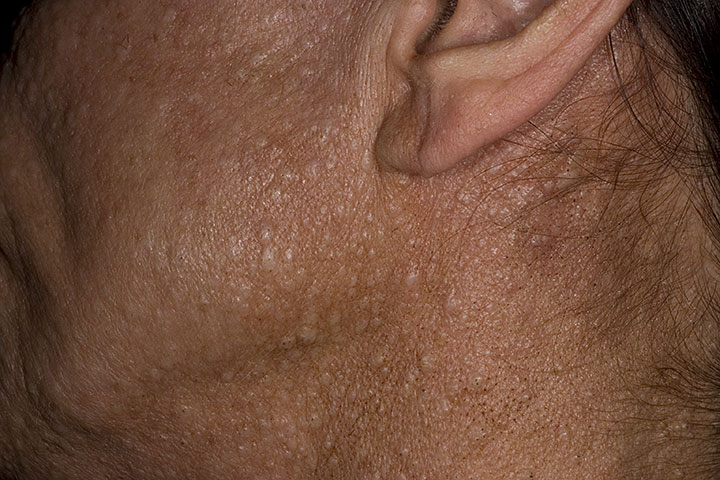
- The characteristic fibrofolliculomas of Birt–Hogg–Dubé syndrome seen on a person's face.
- Specialty: Medical genetics
- Usual onset: adulthood

Birt–Hogg–Dubé syndrome (BHD), also Hornstein–Birt–Hogg–Dubé syndrome, Hornstein–Knickenberg syndrome, and fibrofolliculomas with trichodiscomas and acrochordons is a human, adult onset, autosomal dominant genetic disorder caused by a mutation in the folliculin (FLCN) gene. It can cause susceptibility to kidney cancer, renal and pulmonary cysts, and noncancerous tumors of the hair follicles, called fibrofolliculomas. The symptoms seen in each family are unique, and can include any combination of the three symptoms. Fibrofolliculomas are the most common manifestation, found on the face and upper trunk in over 80% of people with BHD over the age of 40. Pulmonary cysts are equally common (84%) and 24% of people with BHD eventually experience a collapsed lung (spontaneous pneumothorax). Kidney tumors, both cancerous and benign, occur in 14–34% of people with BHD; the associated kidney cancers are often rare hybrid tumors.

Any of these conditions that occurs in a family can indicate a diagnosis of Birt–Hogg–Dubé syndrome, though it is only confirmed by a genetic test for a mutation in the FLCN gene, which codes for the protein folliculin. Though its function is not fully understood, it appears to be a tumor suppressor gene that restricts cell growth and division. Versions of FLCN have been found in other animals, including fruit flies, German Shepherds, rats, and mice. The disease was discovered in 1977, but the connection with FLCN was not elucidated until 2002, after kidney cancer, collapsed lungs, and pulmonary cysts were all definitively connected to BHD.

Birt–Hogg–Dubé syndrome can manifest similarly to other diseases, which must be ruled out when making a diagnosis. These include tuberous sclerosis, which causes skin lesions similar to fibrofolliculomas, and Von Hippel–Lindau disease, which causes hereditary kidney cancers. Once diagnosed, people with BHD are treated preventatively, with monitoring of kidneys and lungs using medical imaging. Fibrofolliculomas can be removed surgically and pneumothorax and kidney cancer are treated according to the normal standard of care. Dermatologic examinations, neck ultrasounds and colonoscopies should be considered as well.

== Signs and symptoms ==
=== Skin ===
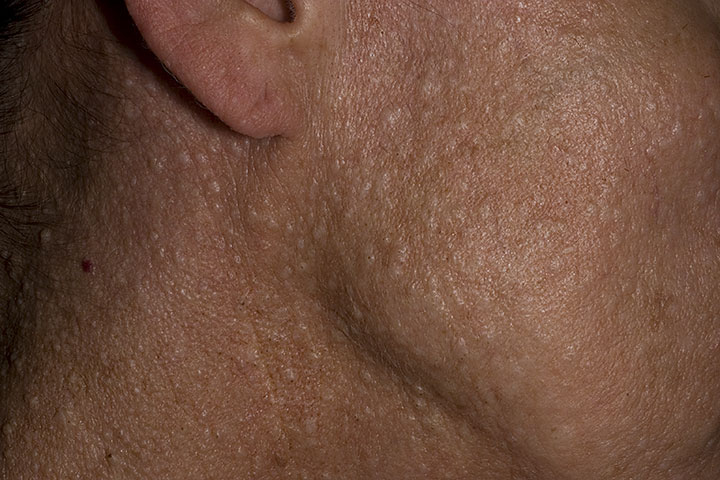
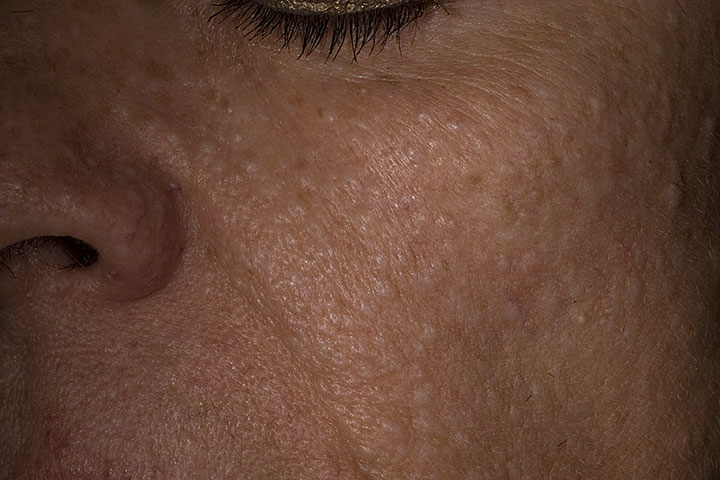
Individual with Birt–Hogg–Dubé syndrome, showing the characteristic facial fibrofolliculomas

Birt–Hogg–Dubé syndrome affects the skin and increases the risk of tumors in the kidneys and lungs. The condition is characterized by multiple noncancerous, dome-shaped tumors of the hair follicles (fibrofolliculomas), particularly on the face, neck, and more rarely, the upper chest. The fibrofolliculomas are generally described as having an opaque white color or a yellowish tone and have a waxy, smooth texture. The tumors are always found on and around the nose and on and behind the outer ear. Typically, they first appear in a person's 20s or 30s, and are found in more than 80% of people with the syndrome above the age of 40. The tumors become larger and more numerous over time. Tumors differ between individuals; they may appear merged in plaques, look similar to a comedo with a plug of keratin, or include epidermoid cysts. A large number of tumors on the face can be associated with hyperseborrhea (abnormally elevated sebum production). The presence of fibrofolliculomas on a person's face can cause significant psychological distress.

Other tumors can include trichodiscomas (tumors of the hair disc, which may be identical to fibrofolliculomas), angiofibromas, and perifollicular fibromas. However, angiofibromas are more common in tuberous sclerosis. Along with the tumors, other skin conditions are seen in people with Birt–Hogg–Dubé syndrome. About 40% of people or families with the disease have papules in their mouths, which can be located on the cheeks (buccal mucosa), tongue, gums, or lips. Either white or mucosa-colored, they are discrete, small, and soft, and consist of fibrous tissue covered in thickened epithelium. Collagenomas of the skin are also found in some families. Many people with BHD have skin lesions that appear to be acrochordons (skin tags), but may instead be fibrofolliculomas. These lesions are usually found in the armpit, on the eyelids, and in folds of skin. Not all individuals develop the facial tumors; some families with the mutation that causes BHD develop only kidney tumors or spontaneous pneumothorax.

=== Kidneys ===
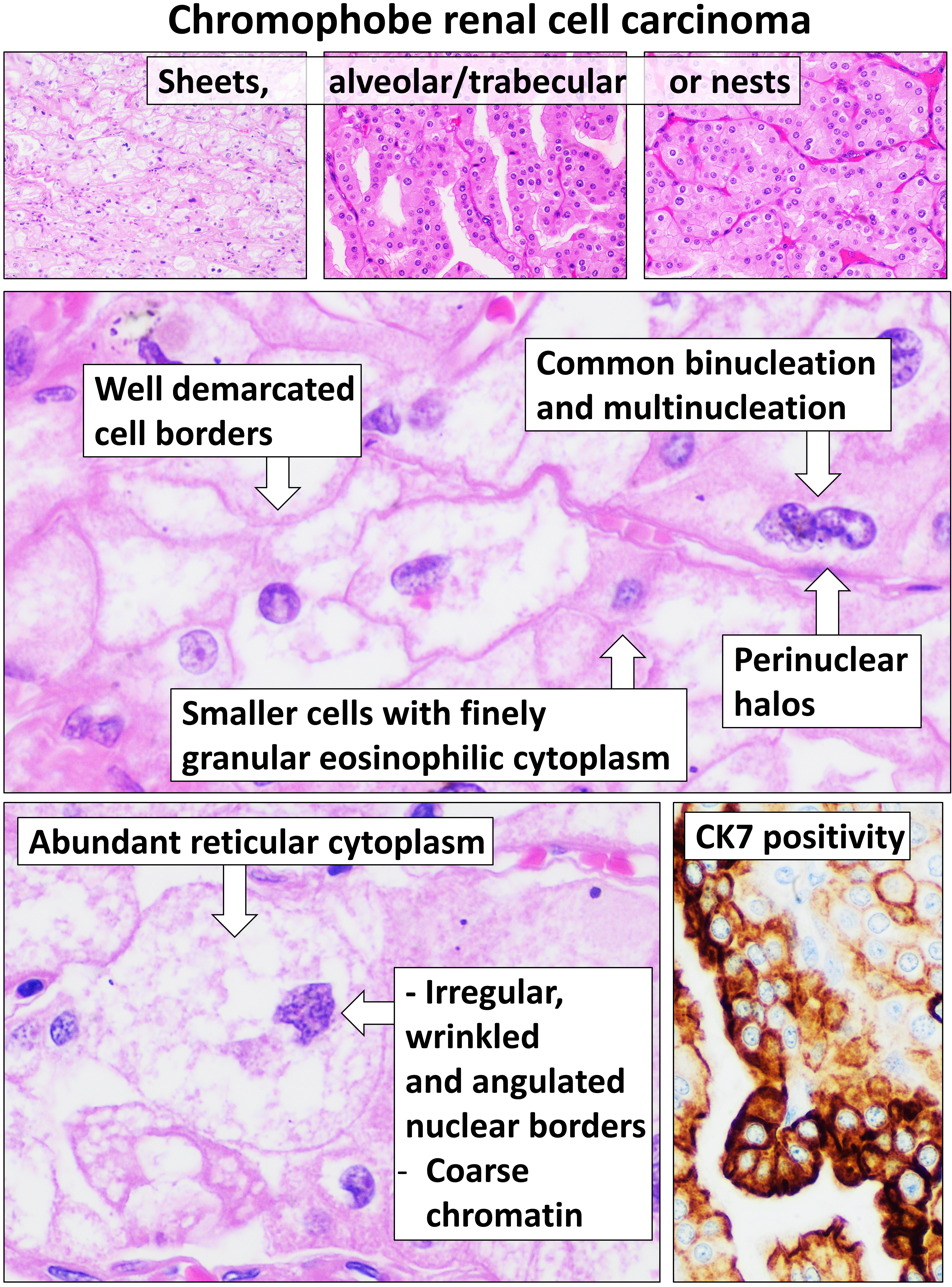
An H&E stain of tissue from a chromophobe renal cell carcinoma, the second-most common cancer associated with BHD

People over 20 years of age with BHD have an increased risk of developing slow-growing kidney tumors (chromophobe renal carcinoma and renal oncocytoma), kidney cysts, and possibly tumors in other organs and tissues. These tumors often occur in both kidneys and in multiple locations in each kidney. The average number of kidney tumors found in a person with BHD is 5.3, though up to 28 tumors have been found. Hybrid oncocytoma/chromophobe carcinoma, found in 50% of cases, is the most commonly found cancer, followed by chromophobe renal carcinoma, clear cell renal carcinoma, renal oncocytoma, and papillary renal cell carcinoma. People over 40 years old and men are more likely to develop kidney tumors, which are diagnosed at a median age of 48. Kidney cancer associated with BHD have been diagnosed in people at ages as young as 20.

In general, people with this syndrome are at roughly at seven times the risk of kidney cancer compared to the unaffected population. Estimates of the incidence among people with the disease range from 14 to 34%. Rarely, it is associated with clear cell renal cell carcinoma and papillary renal cell carcinoma. If it develops in someone with BHD, renal cell carcinoma occurs later in life and has a poor prognosis. Though the types of tumors typically associated with BHD are considered less aggressive, cases of advanced or metastatic kidney cancer have been observed in people with the syndrome. Both benign and cancerous tumors can reduce kidney function over time as they grow larger.

=== Lungs ===
Along with fibrofolliculomas and kidney tumors, affected individuals frequently develop cysts (blebs or bullae) in the subpleural lung base or intraparenchymal space that may rupture and cause an abnormal collection of air in the chest cavity (pneumothorax), which could result in the collapse of a lung. The cysts do not cause other symptoms and lung function is usually normal. More than 83% of people with BHD have cysts, but the syndrome does not cause conditions like progressive chronic obstructive pulmonary disease or generalized respiratory failure, though it does cause emphysema. Spontaneous, sometimes recurrent, pneumothorax occurs far more often and at a younger age with BHD than in the unaffected population. Around 24% of people with the disease have at least one spontaneous pneumothorax, 30 times the occurrence in unaffected people. Though pneumothorax caused by BHD often occurs in middle age, at a median age of 38, 17% of affected people have a spontaneous pneumothorax before turning 40. Pneumothoraces have been seen in people as young as 7 and 16 years of age. Some families have a form of BHD that only affects the lungs.

=== Other organs ===
Thyroid nodules have been associated with the Birt–Hogg–Dubé phenotype, present in 65% of individuals and 90% of families with the syndrome. However, a connection between BHD and thyroid cancer has not been substantiated. Other conditions have been reported to be associated, but may not be caused by the mutation in FLCN or may not be related at all. These include multinodular goiter, medullary thyroid carcinoma, parotid oncocytoma, colonic polyposis, connective tissue nevus, lipomas, angiolipomas, parathyroid adenomas, flecked chorioretinopathy, neurothekeoma, meningiomas, angiofibromas of the face, trichoblastomas, cutaneous focal mucinosis, cutaneous leiomyoma, breast cancer, tonsillar cancer, colorectal cancer, sarcoma of the leg, lung cancer, melanoma, dermatofibrosarcoma protuberans, basal cell carcinoma, cutaneous leiomyosarcoma, and squamous cell carcinoma.

== Pathophysiology ==
=== Genetics ===
This diagram shows how autosomal dominant disorders like BHD are passed on. The unaffected parent produces all normal gametes (sperm and egg) and the affected parent produces half mutant gametes and half normal gametes. Because only one copy of the mutation is needed to have an autosomal dominant disease, each offspring has a 50% chance of having the mutation.

An association with the folliculin (FLCN) gene was first reported in 2002. This 14-exon gene is located on the short arm of chromosome 17 (17p11.2) and has a cytosine-rich region in exon 11 particularly susceptible to mutation. The most common mutation in this region is the insertion or deletion of a cytosine residue, found in 53% of BHD-affected families. No significant difference has been found in the symptoms experienced by families with an insertion at that location compared to those who have a deletion, but mutations in FLCN associated with BHD syndrome are heterogeneous, and are often nonsense mutations or frameshift mutations that cause early truncation of the protein product at the carboxy terminus. Very rarely, missense mutations are observed. The mutations in the FLCN gene that cause Birt–Hogg–Dubé syndrome are germline mutations, which means that they occur in every cell of the body and can be passed down to future generations. These mutations are often passed from one generation to the next in an autosomal dominant fashion, but can occur as a new mutation in an individual with no prior family history (a de novo mutation). The children of an affected parent each has a 50% chance of having the disease. BHD has very high penetrance. A correlation between different FLCN genotypes and phenotypes has not been discovered.

=== Function ===
FLCN creates a protein, folliculin, that has two isoforms. It appears to act as a tumor suppressor, and is expressed strongly in the skin, distal nephrons, and type I pneumocytes. It has also been found in the parotid gland, brain, breast, pancreas, prostate, and ovaries. Tumor suppressors normally prevent cells from growing and dividing too rapidly or in an uncontrolled way. Mutations in the FLCN gene may interfere with the ability of folliculin to restrain cell growth and division, leading to the formation of noncancerous and cancerous tumors. Recent studies suggest that folliculin accomplishes this function through its involvement with cellular metabolism, possibly through modulation of the mTOR (mammalian target of rapamycin) pathway and/or oxidative phosphorylation in mitochondria. Folliculin interacts with FNIP1 and FNIP2 (FLCN-interacting protein) to form a complex with AMP-activated protein kinase. Folliculin's participation in the mTOR pathway may explain the similarity in phenotype between BHD syndrome, Cowden syndrome, tuberous sclerosis, and Peutz–Jeghers syndrome.

Most of the cancer-causing mutations cause the protein to be truncated at the carboxy terminus. The C-terminal end of folliculin has shown to be the domain through which it interacts with FNIP1, and thereby possibly the mTOR pathway. FLCN is highly conserved in vertebrates—it is very similar between many vertebrate species. The 508th amino acid, normally lysine, is affected by a missense mutation in some people with BHD. The lysine at this position is found to be conserved between invertebrate and vertebrate orthologs of folliculin, indicating that it is important to the protein's function.

Folliculin is encoded by the FLCN gene, located on the p arm of human chromosome 17.

People with BHD are born with one mutated copy of the FLCN gene in each cell. Haploinsufficiency—only having one functional copy of the FLCN gene—is enough to cause the fibrofolliculomas and pulmonary cysts, though one copy of the gene is enough to keep kidney cells in check. During a person's lifetime, random mutations might inactivate the normal copy of the gene in a subset of cells. When this occurs, the result is that these cells have no functional copies of the FLCN gene, allowing the cells grow out of control. This loss of heterozygosity is a common mechanism in cancer, and it is frequently detected in the renal cancers associated with BHD. The molecular genetic defects in renal tumors of people with BHD are different from two other similar kidney tumors, chromophobe renal cell carcinoma and renal oncocytoma. BHD-associated tumorigenesis differs between the kidney, where loss of FLCN heterozygosity is responsible for cancers, and the skin, where FLCN is strongly expressed in heterozygotes. FLCN has been found to be overexpressed in fibrofolliculoma tissue, and to have very low levels of expression in affected kidneys. Furthermore, the mTOR pathway is shown to be activated in tumor tissue from both humans and mice.

Renal cystogenesis and tumorigenesis in BHD have been shown to be driven by the constitutive activation of TFEB.

== Diagnosis ==
BHD can be suggested by clinical findings but is definitively diagnosed by molecular genetic testing to detect mutations in the FLCN gene. The classical clinical triad includes benign growths of the hair follicles, pulmonary cysts and spontaneous pneumothorax, and bilateral, multifocal renal tumors.

=== Clinical triad ===
The cutaneous manifestations of BHD were originally described as fibrofolliculomas (abnormal growths of a hair follicle), trichodiscomas (hamartomatous lesions with a hair follicle at the periphery, often found on the face), and acrochordons (skin tags). Cutaneous manifestations are confirmed by histology. Most individuals (89%) with BHD are found to have multiple cysts in both lungs, and 24% have had one or more episodes of pneumothorax. The cysts can be detected by chest CT scan. Renal tumors can manifest as multiple types of renal cell carcinoma, but certain pathological subtypes (including chromophobe, oncocytoma, and oncocytic hybrid tumors) are more commonly seen. Although the original syndrome was discovered on the basis of cutaneous findings, individuals with BHD may only manifest the pulmonary and/or renal findings, without any skin lesions. Though these signs indicate BHD, it is only confirmed with a genetic test for FLCN mutations.

=== Genetic testing ===
FLCN mutations are detected by sequencing in 88% of probands with this syndrome. This means that some people with the clinical diagnosis have mutations that are not detectable by current technology, or that mutations in another currently unknown gene could be responsible for a minority of cases. In addition, amplifications and deletions in exonic regions are also tested. Genetic testing can be useful to confirm the clinical diagnosis and to provide a means of determining other at-risk individuals in a family even if they have not yet developed BHD symptoms.

=== Differential diagnosis ===
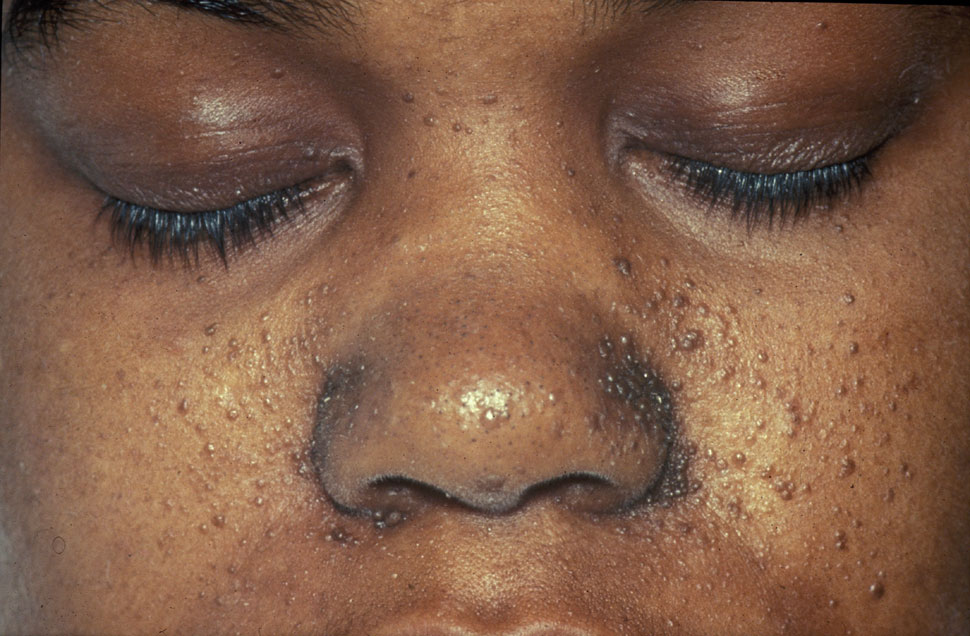
The person in this image has tuberous sclerosis. The skin lesions caused by tuberous sclerosis (angiofibromas) must be distinguished from the characteristic fibrofolliculomas of BHD, which also occur primarily on the face.

BHD can be difficult to diagnose from symptoms alone, because hereditary renal cancers, pneumothorax, and cutaneous tumors occur with other syndromes. Hereditary bilateral, multifocal kidney tumors similar to those seen in BHD can occur with von Hippel–Lindau disease (clear cell renal cell carcinoma), hereditary papillary renal cancer (papillary renal cell carcinoma), and hereditary leiomyomatosis and renal cell cancer syndrome. They are differentiated with examination of the tumors' histology.

Hereditary recurrent pneumothorax or pulmonary cysts are associated with Marfan syndrome, Ehlers–Danlos syndrome, tuberous sclerosis complex, alpha1-antitrypsin deficiency, and cystic fibrosis. Nonhereditary recurrent pneumothorax and/or pulmonary cysts can occur with Langerhans cell histiocytosis and lymphangioleiomyomatosis. These conditions are differentiated from BHD through examining the patient history and performing a physical examination. In women suspected to have the disease, ruling out pulmonary or thoracic endometriosis may be necessary.

Though fibrofolliculomas are unique to BHD, they may present with an ambiguous appearance and must be confirmed histologically. Other diseases can mimic the dermatologic manifestations of BHD, including tuberous sclerosis complex, Cowden syndrome, familial trichoepitheliomas, and multiple endocrine neoplasia type 1. Tuberous sclerosis must be distinguished because both disorders can present with angiofibromas on the face, though they are more common in tuberous sclerosis.

== Management ==
The different manifestations of BHD are controlled in different ways. The fibrofolliculomas can be removed surgically, through curettage, shave excision, skin resurfacing, or laser ablation; this is not a permanent solution, though, as the tumors often recur. Dermatologic examination is recommended every 6-12 months due to risk of melanoma. Thyroid/parotid ultrasound should be considered annually and colonoscopies should be considered also. The renal and pulmonary symptoms are generally managed preventatively: CT scans, ultrasounds, or MRIs of the kidneys are recommended regularly, and family members are advised not to smoke. However, surgical interventions such as video assisted thoracoscopy (VATS) and mechanical or chemical pleurodesis should be considered in case of recurrent pneumothorax. MRIs are the preferred method for surveillance of the kidneys in people with BHD because they do not carry the same risk of radiation complications as CT scans, and are more sensitive than ultrasounds. Smokers with Birt–Hogg–Dubé have more severe pulmonary symptoms than non-smokers. Though nephrectomy is sometimes indicated, kidney tumors in cases of BHD are often removed without taking the whole kidney, in a partial nephrectomy. Knockout mouse studies have shown that administration of rapamycin may mitigate the effects of FLCN mutations on kidneys and improve renal cancer prognoses because of folliculin's interaction with the mTOR pathway.

== Epidemiology ==
The disorder has been reported in more than 100 families worldwide, though some sources cite up to 400 families, and it is inherited in an autosomal dominant pattern. It is considered to be under-diagnosed because of the variability in its expression. The pattern of mutations and spectrum of symptoms are heterogeneous between individuals. Less severe skin phenotypes are seen in women and people of both sexes who have a late onset of skin symptoms.

== History ==
The syndrome was first well described in 1977, by three Canadian physicians, Arthur R. Birt, Georgina R. Hogg, and William J. Dubé. The earliest case of possible BHD in the medical literature was published by Burnier and Rejsek in 1927, who described a case of perifollicular fibromas on a 56-year-old woman's face. Trichodiscomas were first described in 1974 by H. S. Zackheim and H. Pinkus, but were not associated with BHD until Birt, Hogg, and Dubé. The first case of BHD with the systemic symptoms was described by Hornstein and Knickenberg and found in two siblings and their father, all of whom exhibited colon polyps and the characteristic fibrofolliculomas. Though the siblings did not have renal or pulmonary symptoms, their father had cysts in his lungs and kidneys. Hornstein-Knickenberg syndrome is a now-deprecated name for the inherited fibrofolliculomas inherent to BHD.

Birt, Hogg, and Dubé examined a family with a hereditary thyroid cancer, and discovered that many of the members had fibrofolliculomas, trichodiscomas, and acrochordons, which became defined as the classical symptoms of the eponymous disease. The first case of spontaneous pneumothorax associated with BHD was discovered in 1986; the first case of renal cancer followed in 1993, and the presence of lung cysts in people with BHD was confirmed in 1999. People with BHD were once thought to be at higher risk for colorectal polyps and neoplasms, but this has been disproven. The BHD Foundation supports research into the syndrome and holds regular symposia in BHD and related disorders for researchers, clinicians, and family members.

== Other animals ==
Genes related to FLCN and diseases similar to BHD have been found in dogs, fruit flies, rats, and mice. In German Shepherd dogs, missense mutations in the canine ortholog of FLCN cause a similar phenotype to human BHD—kidney cancers (in this case, multifocal renal cystadenocarcinoma) and skin tumors (nodular dermatofibrosis). They had a similar pattern of tumorigenesis to human BHD in that the skin lesions were heterozygous for the FLCN mutation, and the renal tumors were likely caused by loss of heterozygosity. Female German Shepherds with a FLCN mutation are also prone to uterine leiomyomas.

A homolog of FLCN called DBHD has been discovered in the common fruit fly, Drosophila melanogaster. Decrease expression of the DBHD results in loss of male germline stem cells (GSC), which suggest that DBHD is required for male GSC maintenance in the fly testis. Further, DBHD regulates GSC maintenance downstream or in parallel of the JAK/STAT and Dpp signal-transduction pathways, which suggest that BHD regulates tumorigenesis by controlling stem cells in human { Singh et al. 2006}

A line of rats with hereditary kidney cancer were developed by Japanese researchers. They have a mutation in the FLCN homolog that produces a truncated protein, though they do not develop the cutaneous or pulmonary symptoms seen in humans. Heterozygotes have renal abnormalities seen very early in life that develop into clear-cell and hybrid tumors, significantly shortening the animals' lifespans; they also are prone to endometrial and salivary gland clear-cell hyperplasia as well as rhabdomyolysis. Homozygotes do not survive to birth. When a wild-type FLCN gene was added, the phenotype was rescued.

Knockout mice have been created for a kidney-cancer causing mutation of BHD; heterozygotes develop kidney cysts and tumors that lead to renal failure within three weeks of birth. In these mice, the mTOR pathway was inappropriately activated, indicating that the mouse homolog of FLCN plays a regulatory role in this pathway. Rapamycin partially rescued the phenotype by regulating mTOR. Homozygotes die in utero.
