= Folliculin =

Protein-coding gene

FLCN

Identifiers
- Aliases: FLCN, BHD, FLCL, Folliculin, DENND8B
- External IDs: OMIM: 607273; MGI: 2442184; GeneCards: FLCN
Available structures
| PDB | Ortholog search: PDBe RCSB |
| PDB | List of PDB id codes 3V42 |

Gene location (Human)
| Chr. | Chromosome 17 (human) |
| Band | 17p11.2 | Start | 17,212,212 bp |
| Band | 17p11.2 | End | 17,237,188 bp |

Gene location (Mouse)
| Chr. | Chromosome 11 (mouse) |
| Band | 11|11 B1.3 | Start | 59,682,234 bp |
| Band | 11|11 B1.3 | End | 59,700,842 bp |
RNA expression pattern
| Bgee | Human / Mouse (ortholog); Top expressed in: buccal mucosa cell; right hemisphere of cerebellum; apex of heart; canal of the cervix; gastric mucosa; body of uterus; left ovary; muscle layer of sigmoid colon; right ovary; oocyte / Top expressed in: submandibular gland; pineal gland; gastrula; iris; masseter muscle; Rostral migratory stream; neural layer of retina; left lung lobe; ciliary body; retinal pigment epithelium; More reference expression data |
| BioGPS | n/a |
Gene ontology
| Molecular function | guanyl-nucleotide exchange factor activity; protein binding; protein-containing complex binding |
| Cellular component | cytoplasm; cell-cell contact zone; plasma membrane; midbody; lysosome; nucleus; cytosol; cilium |
| Biological process | regulation of protein phosphorylation; negative regulation of protein localization to nucleus; regulation of cytokinesis; positive regulation of autophagy; negative regulation of Rho protein signal transduction; negative regulation of cell migration; TOR signaling; negative regulation of cell growth; positive regulation of apoptotic process; positive regulation of cell adhesion; positive regulation of transcription by RNA polymerase II; negative regulation of transcription by RNA polymerase II; in utero embryonic development; positive regulation of protein phosphorylation; cell-cell junction assembly; negative regulation of gene expression; negative regulation of mitochondrion organization; positive regulation of transforming growth factor beta receptor signaling pathway; regulation of TOR signaling; negative regulation of TOR signaling; positive regulation of TOR signaling; regulation of histone acetylation; negative regulation of protein kinase B signaling; negative regulation of ERK1 and ERK2 cascade; negative regulation of cell proliferation involved in kidney development; regulation of pro-B cell differentiation; negative regulation of ATP biosynthetic process; hemopoiesis; energy homeostasis; mitochondrion organization; negative regulation of transcription, DNA-templated; negative regulation of cold-induced thermogenesis; negative regulation of cellular respiration; negative regulation of mitochondrial DNA metabolic process; negative regulation of muscle tissue development; negative regulation of post-translational protein modification; positive regulation of intrinsic apoptotic signaling pathway |
Sources:Amigo / QuickGO
Orthologs
| Databases | NCBI: entry; OMA: entry |
| Species | Human | Mouse |
| Entrez | 201163 | 216805 |
| Ensembl | ENSG00000154803 | ENSMUSG00000032633 |
| UniProt | Q8NFG4 | Q8QZS3 |
| RefSeq (mRNA) | NM_144606; NM_144997; NM_001353229; NM_001353230; NM_001353231 | NM_001271356; NM_001271357; NM_146018 |
| RefSeq (protein) | NP_653207; NP_659434; NP_001340158; NP_001340159; NP_001340160 | NP_001258285; NP_001258286; NP_666130 |
| Location (UCSC) | Chr 17: 17.21 – 17.24 Mb | Chr 11: 59.68 – 59.7 Mb |
| PubMed search |
- Wikidata
| View/Edit Human | View/Edit Mouse |

The tumor suppressor gene FLCN encodes the protein folliculin, also known as Birt–Hogg–Dubé syndrome protein, which functions as an inhibitor of Lactate Dehydrogenase-A and a regulator of the Warburg effect. Folliculin (FLCN) is also associated with Birt–Hogg–Dubé syndrome, which is an autosomal dominant inherited cancer syndrome in which affected individuals are at risk for the development of benign cutaneous tumors (folliculomas), pulmonary cysts (often associated with pneumothorax), and kidney tumors.

== Gene ==
=== Structure ===
The FLCN gene consists of 14 exons.

=== Location ===
Cytogenetic location: The FLCN gene is located on the short (p) arm of chromosome 17 at position 11.2. (17p11.2).

Molecular location on chromosome 17: base pairs 17,056,252 to 17,081,230 (NCI Build 36.1)

=== Clinical significance ===
Germline mutations in the FLCN gene cause Birt–Hogg–Dubé syndrome (BHD), an autosomal dominant disease that predisposes individuals to develop benign tumors of the hair follicle called fibrofolliculomas, lung cysts, spontaneous pneumothorax, and an increased risk for kidney tumors. FLCN mutations have also been found in the germline of patients with inherited spontaneous pneumothorax and no other clinical manifestations.

In a risk assessment performed in affected and unaffected members of BHD families, the odds ratio for developing kidney tumors in a person affected with BHD was 6.9 times greater than his unaffected siblings. The odds ratio for spontaneous pneumothorax in BHD affected individuals, when adjusted for age, was 50.3 times greater than unaffected family members.

=== Discovery ===
Birt–Hogg–Dubé syndrome was originally described by three Canadian physicians in a family in which 15 of 70 members over 3 generations exhibited a triad of dermatological lesions (fibrofolliculomas, trichodiscomas and acrochordons). Subsequently, cosegregation of kidney neoplasms with BHD cutaneous lesions was observed in 3 families with a family history of kidney tumors, suggesting that kidney tumors may be part of the BHD syndrome phenotype. In order to identify the genetic locus for BHD syndrome, genetic linkage analysis was performed in families recruited on the basis of BHD cutaneous lesions. A region spanning chromosome 17p11 was identified and mutations in a novel gene, FLCN, were subsequently found in the germline of individuals affected with BHD syndrome.

=== Genetics ===
The FLCN gene encodes a 64 kDa protein, FLCN, which is highly conserved across species. The majority of germline FLCN mutations identified in BHD patients are loss-of-function mutations including frameshift mutations (insertion/deletion), nonsense mutations, and splice site mutations that are predicted to inactivate the FLCN protein, although some missense mutations have been reported that exchange one nucleotide for another and consequently result in a different amino acid at the mutation site. Most mutations are identified by DNA sequencing. With the advent of multiplex ligation-dependent probe amplification (MLPA) technology, partial deletions of the FLCN gene have also been identified permitting a FLCN mutation detection rate in BHD cohorts that approaches 90%. Very few FLCN mutations have been found in association with sporadic kidney tumors indicating that FLCN mutation may play only a minor role in non-inherited kidney cancer.

Experimental evidence supports a role for FLCN as a tumor suppressor gene. In BHD-associated kidney tumors, the inherited FLCN gene with a germline mutation is present in all cells, but the remaining wild type copy is inactivated in the tumor cells through somatic mutation or loss of heterozygosity. Naturally occurring dog and rat models with germline Flcn mutations develop kidney tumors that retain only the mutant copy of the gene. Homozygous inactivation of Flcn in these animal models is lethal to the embryo. Tumors develop in mice injected with FLCN-deficient kidney cancer cells from BHD-associated human tumors but when wild type FLCN is restored in these cells, tumor development is inhibited. Additionally, injection of kidney tumor cells from the adenocarcinoma cell line ACHN with FLCN inactivation into immunocompromised mice resulted in the growth of significantly larger tumors, further underscoring a tumor suppressor role for FLCN. Based on the presence of FLCN staining by immunohistochemistry, haploinsufficiency, that is mutation of one copy of FLCN with retention of the wild type copy, may be sufficient for the development of fibrofolliculomas and lung cysts.

== Function ==
=== Interactions ===
FLCN has been shown to interact through its C-terminus with two new co-chaperones folliculin interacting protein 1 (FNIP1) and folliculin interacting protein 2 (FNIP2/FNIPL), and indirectly through FNIP1 and FNIP2 with AMP-activated protein kinase (AMPK). AMPK is an important energy sensor in cells and negative regulator of mechanistic target of rapamycin (mTOR) suggesting that FLCN and FNIP1 may play a role in modulating mTOR activity through energy- or nutrient-sensing pathways. Coimmunoprecipitation experiments with FNIPL/FNIP2 and FLCN expressed in Cos7 cells have shown that the C-termini of FLCN and FNIPL/FNIP2 are required for optimal FLCN-FNIPL binding. In the absence of either FNIP1 or FNIPL/FNIP2 expression, FLCN localizes to the nucleus, while co-expressed FLCN and FNIPL colocalize to the cytoplasm in a reticular pattern.

=== FLCN phosphorylation ===
FLCN phosphorylation was diminished by rapamycin and amino acid starvation and facilitated by FNIP1 overexpression, suggesting that FLCN phosphorylation may be regulated by mTOR and AMPK signaling. FNIP1 was phosphorylated by AMPK and its phosphorylation was inhibited in a dose-dependent manner by an AMPK inhibitor, resulting in reduced FNIP1 expression. FLCN has multiple phosphorylation sites including serine 62, which are differentially affected by FNIP1 binding and by inhibitors of mTOR and AMPK. The significance of this modification, however, is unknown.

=== Functions of FLCN ===
Folliculin (FLCN) functions as a binding partner and uncompetitive inhibitor of Lactate Dehydrogenase-A (LDHA). A flexible loop within the amino-terminus of FLCN controls movement of the LDHA active site loop, tightly regulating its enzyme activity and, consequently, metabolic homeostasis in normal cells. Cancer cells that experience the Warburg effect show FLCN dissociation from LDHA. Treatment of these cells with a decapeptide derived from the FLCN loop region causes cell death. The glycolytic shift of cancer cells seems to be the result of FLCN inactivation or dissociation from LDHA. FLCN-mediated inhibition of LDHA provides a new paradigm for the regulation of glycolysis.

Several pathways in which FLCN plays a role as a tumor suppressor have been identified, but it remains to be determined which of these pathways, when dysregulated, leads to the cutaneous, lung and kidney phenotypes associated with Birt-Hogg-Dubé syndrome.

==== Regulation of the AKT-mTOR pathway ====
Work with Flcn-deficient mouse models suggests a role for FLCN in regulating the AKT-mechanistic target of rapamycin (mTOR) signaling pathway, but the results are conflicting. mTOR activation was seen in the highly cystic kidneys that developed in mice with kidney-targeted inactivation of Flcn. Elevated AKT and phospho-AKT proteins, and activation of mTORC1 and mTORC2 were observed in late-onset tumors that developed in aged Flcn heterozygous mice subsequent to loss of the remaining Flcn wild type allele, and in FLCN-deficient kidney tumors from BHD patients. On the other hand, mTOR inhibition was demonstrated in smaller cysts (although mTOR activation was seen in larger cysts) that developed in Flcn heterozygous knockout mice generated with a gene trapping approach. N-ethyl-N-nitrosourea (ENU) mutagenesis of another Flcn heterozygous mouse model produced tumors with reduced mTOR activity. Evidence from studies in yeast suggests that the FLCN ortholog Bhd activates the mTOR ortholog Tor2. These opposing effects of FLCN deficiency on the mTOR pathway have led to the hypothesis that FLCN regulation of mTOR activity may be context or cell-type dependent.

==== mTORC1 activation on the lysosome ====
Resolution of the crystal structure of the FLCN carboxy-terminal protein domain revealed a structural similarity to the differentially expressed in normal cells and neoplasia (DENN) domain of DENND1B suggesting that they are distantly related proteins. The DENN domain family of proteins are guanine nucleotide exchange factors (GEFs) for Rab proteins, members of the Ras superfamily of G proteins that are involved in vesicular transport suggesting that FLCN may have a similar function.

FLCN acts as a GTPase-activating protein (GAP) toward Rag C/D GTPases, members of another Ras-related GTP-binding protein family, which are necessary for amino acid-dependent mTORC1 activation at the lysosomal membrane. The heterodimeric Rag GTPases (RagA or B in complex with RagC or D) in a lysosome-associated complex with Ragulator and vacuolar adenosine triphosphatase (v-ATPase) interact with mTORC1 in response to amino acids from the lysosomal lumen to promote translocation of mTORC1 to the lysosomal surface for activation by the small GTPase Ras-homolog enriched in brain (Rheb). GTP-loading of RagA/B is a requirement for amino acid signaling to mTORC1. In recent studies, FLCN was shown to localize to the lysosome surface under amino acid starved conditions, where with its binding partners FNIP1/FNIP2, FLCN acts as a GAP to facilitate GDP-loading of Rag C/D, clarifying the role of this Rag GTPase in amino acid-dependent mTORC1 activation. Another report demonstrated that FLCN in association with FNIP1 preferentially binds to GDP-bound /nucleotide free Rag A/B under amino acid deprived conditions suggesting a potential role for FLCN as a GEF for RagA/B. Recently the heterodimeric Lst4-Lst7 complex in yeast, orthologous to the mammalian FLCN-FNIP1 complex, was found to function as a GAP for Gtr2, the yeast ortholog of Rag C/D, and cluster at the vacuolar membrane in amino acid starved cells. Refeeding of amino acids stimulated Lst4-Lst7 binding to and GAP activity towards Gtr2 resulting in mTORC1 activation and demonstrating conservation of a GAP function for FLCN in lower organisms.

==== Control of TFE3/TFEB transcriptional activation ====
TFE3 and TFEB are members of the microphthalmia-associated transcription factor (MiTF) family, which also includes MiTF and TFEC. Gene fusions of TFE3 with a number of different gene partners can arise sporadically and are responsible for Xp11.2 translocation renal cell carcinoma. FLCN-deficient BHD associated renal tumors and tumors that develop in mouse models with Flcn inactivation were found to have elevated expression of transmembrane glycoprotein NMB (GPNMB), a transcriptional target of TFE3. Subsequently, FLCN was shown to regulate TFE3 activity by sequestering TFE3 in the cytoplasm where it is transcriptionally inactive; however, loss of FLCN expression results in localization of TFE3 to the nucleus driving transcriptional activation of its target genes including GPNMB. Another study investigating genes required for mouse embryonic stem cell (ESC) progression from pluripotency to cell lineage differentiation revealed that Flcn in complex with Fnip1/2 was necessary for ESC exit from pluripotency through cytoplasmic sequestering of Tfe3, thereby abrogating expression of its gene target, estrogen-related receptor beta(Esrrb), the core pluripotency factor.

==== Regulation of PGC-1α and mitochondrial biogenesis ====
Chromophobe renal carcinoma and hybrid oncocytic tumors with features of chromophobe renal carcinoma and renal oncocytoma, which are the most common renal tumor histologic subtypes associated with BHD, contain large numbers of mitochondria. Comparative gene expression profiling of BHD-associated renal tumors and sporadic counterpart tumors revealed distinct gene expression patterns and cytogenetic differences between the groups. BHD-associated tumors displayed high expression of mitochondrial- and oxidative phosphorylation-associated genes reflecting deregulation of the peroxisome proliferator-activated receptor gamma coactivator 1-alpha / mitochondrial transcription factor A (PGC-1α/TFAM) signaling axis. FLCN expression was inversely correlated with PGC-1α activation, which drives mitochondrial biogenesis. In support of these data, FLCN inactivation was correlated with PGC-1α activation and upregulation of its target genes in BHD-associated renal tumors, and kidney, heart and muscle tissues from genetically engineered mouse models with Flcn inactivation targeted to the respective tissues.

==== Maintenance of cell-cell adhesions and regulation of RhoA signaling ====
Yeast two-hybrid screening performed by two independent groups identified p0071 (plakophilin-4) as a FLCN interacting protein. p0071 binds E-cadherin at adherens junctions, which are important for maintenance of cell architecture in epithelial tissues, and regulates RhoA activity. Loss of FLCN function leads to a disruptive effect on cell-cell adhesions and cell polarity, and dysregulation of RhoA signaling. Additional supporting evidence includes reduction in E-cadherin expression and increased alveolar apoptosis in lungs from lung-targeted Flcn-deficient mice, and increased cell-cell adhesions in FLCN-deficient lung cell lines. These studies suggest a potential function of FLCN in maintaining proper cell-cell adhesions for lung cell integrity and support the "stretch hypothesis" as a mechanism of pulmonary cyst pathogenesis in BHD.

==== Ciliogenesis and cilia-dependent flow sensory mechanisms ====
Individuals affected with the inherited kidney cancer syndromes von Hippel–Lindau syndrome and tuberous sclerosis complex can develop kidney cysts in addition to kidney tumors, which have been shown to result from defects in primary cilia function. BHD patients also may present with kidney cysts, which led researchers to investigate a potential role for FLCN in regulating primary cilia development and/or function. FLCN protein was found to localize on primary cilia, the basal body and centrosome in different cell types. FLCN siRNA knockdown in nutrient starved kidney cells resulted in delayed cilia development. Both overexpression of FLCN in FLCN-expressing kidney cells and knockdown of FLCN resulted in reduced numbers of cilia and aberrant cell divisions, suggesting that levels of FLCN must be tightly regulated for proper ciliogenesis. Primary cilia play a role in inhibiting the canonical Wnt signaling pathway ( Wnt/β-catenin signaling pathway) by sequestering β-catenin in the basal body, and dysregulated Wnt/β-catenin signaling has been linked to kidney cyst formation. In Flcn-deficient mouse inner medullary collecting duct cells, levels of unphosphorylated (active) β-catenin and its down stream targets were elevated suggesting that improper activation of the canonical Wnt/β-catenin signaling pathway through defective ciliogenesis may lead to kidney, and potentially lung, cyst development in BHD syndrome.

Additional experimental evidence that FLCN may be involved in primary cilium function was obtained from a yeast two-hybrid screening that identified KIF3A as a FLCN interacting protein. Intraflagellar transport, which is required for primary cilium assembly and maintenance, is driven by kinesin-2 motor made up of subunits KIF3A and KIF3B. Researchers have shown that FLCN could interact with both subunits in a cilium-dependent manner and localize to cilia in FLCN-expressing but not FLCN-deficient cells. Cilia have been shown to act as flow sensors and suppress mTOR signaling by activating the serine/threonine kinase LKB1 located in the basal body of resting cells in response to flow stimuli. LKB1 in turn phosphorylates and activates AMPK, a negative regulator of mTOR activation. Flow stress was able to suppress mTOR signaling in FLCN-expressing human kidney cells but not under FLCN deficient conditions, and required intact cilia. FLCN was shown to recruit LKB1 and facilitate its interaction with AMPK in the basal body in a flow stress-dependent manner. These findings suggest a role for FLCN in the mechanosensory signaling machinery of the cell that controls the cilia-dependent regulation of the LKB1-AMPK-mTOR signaling axis.

==== Other potential functions ====
Additional potential roles for FLCN in autophagy, TGF β signaling, regulation of AMPK activity, and regulation of HIF-1α transcriptional activity have been described.
