= Koenen's tumor =

- Other names: Koenen's periungual fibroma and Periungual fibroma
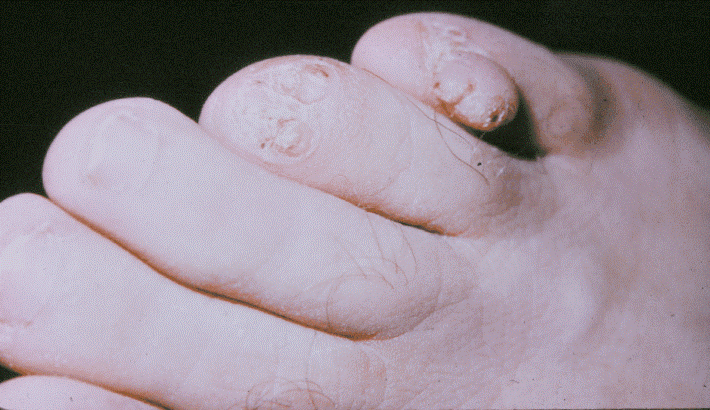
- Koenen tumor in patient with tuberous sclerosis complex
- Specialty: Dermatology

Koenen's tumor (KT), also commonly termed periungual angiofibroma, is a subtype of the angiofibromas. Angiofibromas are benign papule, nodule, and/or tumor lesions that are separated into various subtypes based primarily on the characteristic locations of their lesions. KTs are angiofibromas that develop in and under the toenails and/or fingernails. KTs were once considered as the same as another subtype of the angiofibromas viz., acral angiofibromas. While the literature may still sometimes regard KTs as acral angiofibromas, acral angiofibromas are characteristically located in areas close to but not in the toenails and fingernails as well as in the soles of the feet and palms of the hands. KTs are here regarded as distinct from acral angiofibromas.

KTs most commonly develop in individuals who have the rare genetic disease, tuberous sclerosis (a heritable neurocutaneous disorder) and uncommonly in individuals that do not have this genetic disease. One individual with another rare genetic disease that has similarities to tuberous sclerosis, the Birt-Hogg-Dube syndrome, has also been reported to have typical KT findings.

KTs are strictly benign (i.e. do not metastasize) but may be painful, disfiguring, and sometimes large and/or incapacitating lesions. They have often been treated by strictly local surgical resections. However, they do have a high rate of recurrence at the site of resection and therefore have been treated with various other non-invasive local measures in efforts to avoid recurrences; these other methods have also been preferred to treat numerous tumors in individuals, for cosmetic reasons, and/or to relieve tumor-induce incapacitations.

== Presentation ==
In individuals with tuberous sclerosis, KTs commonly present with multiple firm red-colored to skin-colored nodules or tumors that emanate from the proximal nail fold or, less often, proximal skin beneath the nail. They often develop after puberty; increase in number over time; more frequently occur in the toenails than fingernails (the most common sites are on the big toe and thumb); are generally 5 to 10 mm in length but occasionally grow to far larger sizes; and may be or become disfiguring, painful, and/or incapacitating. Nearly 50% of post-puberty individuals with tuberous sclerosis have KTs. (Tuberous sclerosis is also associated with a second type of angiofibroma, adenoma sebaceum, also termed facial angiofibroma, in ~75% of cases.) Individuals presenting with KTs that do not have tuberous sclerosis commonly present with a single lesion in a nail bed. KT may also present as a recurrence of a lesion at the site where it was surgically removed. Rare cases of KTs have had a history of crushing trauma at the sites where the KTs later developed.

== Pathology ==
Microscopic histopathological analyses of KTs commonly reveal a lesion with epidermal acanthosis (i.e. thickening of the skin), hyperkeratosis (i.e. thickening of the outermost layer of the epidermis), and skin features typical of angiofibroma viz., spindle-shaped or star-shaped fibroblasts and ectatic blood vessels in a dense collagen fiber connective tissue background.

== Etiology ==
In cases associated with tuberous sclerosis, KTs appear to be a result of this disease's associated genetic abnormalities, i.e. loss-of-function mutations in one of the two normally paired TSC1 or one of the two normally paired TSC2 tumor suppressor genes. As a part of their functions, the TSC1 and TSC2 tumor suppressor genes act to suppress the abnormal growth of cells by contributing to the suppression of the mammalian target of rapamycin (i.e. mTOR) protein that promotes cell growth and proliferation. Inactivation of one of the TSC1 or TSC2 genes appears responsible for unleashing mTor and thereby promoting the growth of the many strictly benign lesions, including KTs, that develop in individuals with tuberous sclerosis. mTOR is inhibited by rapamycin, a drug which has been used as a topical application to successfully treat a few cases of Koenen's tumors.

A small number of cases in individuals including those that do not have tuberous sclerosis may develop KTs as reactions to local traumas.

== Treatment ==
The treatment of KTs has varied depending on their size, numbers, locations, symptoms, damage to tissues, and disfiguring effects. Excision may be the treatment of choice for surgically accessible lesions. However, following surgical removal, KTs have a high rate of local recurrence, particularly in cases where the lesions are not completely removed. Other treatment methods, which may be used in combination with surgical removal and/or with each other include: carbon dioxide-based laser vaporization; electrocauterization; shave excision of the tumor with phenolization (i.e. excision of the tumor's protruding portion followed by treatment of the proximal perionych [i.e., skin around a nail] with phenol to eradicate the root of the tumor); and in individuals with tuberous sclerosis, topical application of sirolimus, i.e. rapamycin, (1% solution). Some of the latter methods have been used in order to preserve the nail matrix and nailplate and may be ideal for younger patients with few tumors since they may leave a normal appearing nail.

== See also ==
- List of cutaneous conditions
- Nail anatomy
