= Mantleoma =

- Specialty: Dermatology

Mantleoma is a benign neoplasm with mantle differentiation and they tend to occur on the face, early neoplasms consist only of cords and columns of undifferentiated epithelial cells.

== See also ==
- Trichodiscoma
- Fibrofolliculoma
