= Fibrous papule of the nose =

- Other names: Benign solitary fibrous papule, fibrous papule of the face
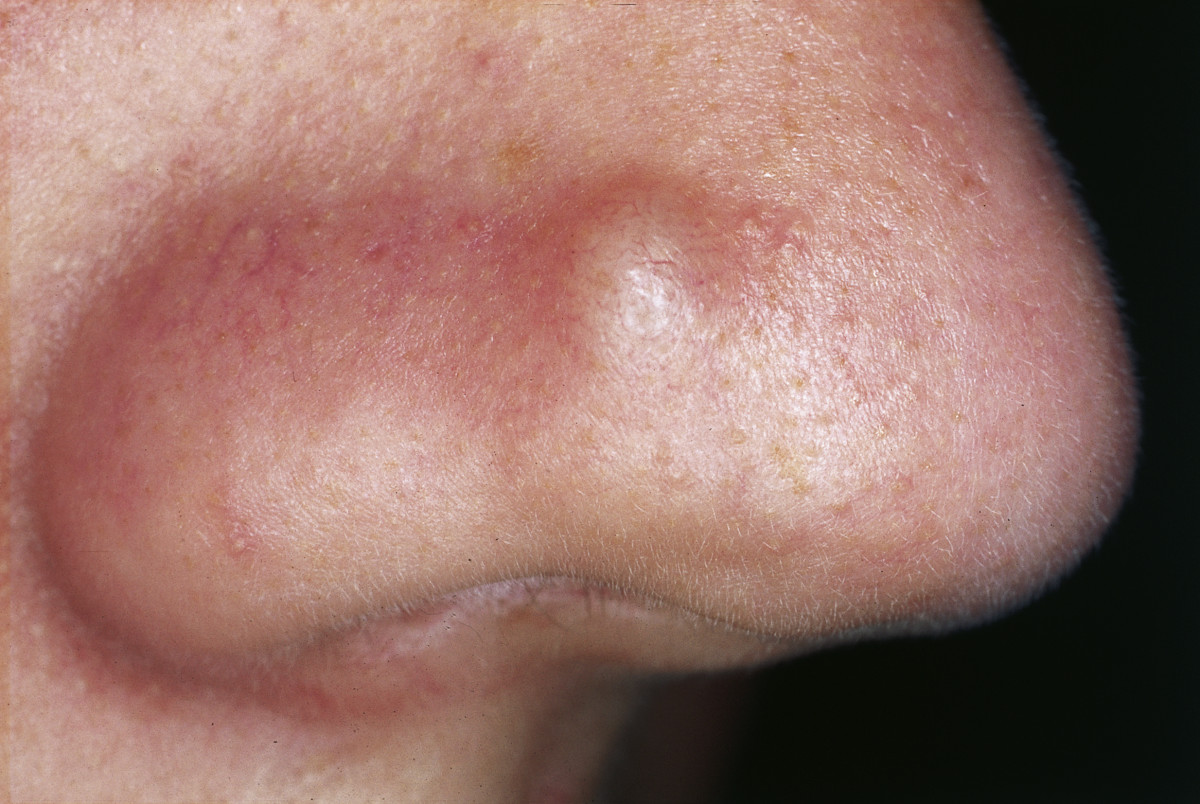
- Fibrous papule of the nose
- Specialty: Dermatology
- Symptoms: Persistent, usually solitary, unchanging, small, shiny, smooth, firm bump on or near nose
- Usual onset: Young adult
- Duration: Permanent
- Causes: Unknown, originates in dermal dendrocyte
- Diagnostic method: Appearance, skin biopsy, histopathology
- Differential diagnosis: Benign melanocytic naevus, early BCC
- Treatment: Usually none, shave excision, electrosurgery
- Prognosis: Harmless, longlasting, recurrence rare
- Frequency: Common

Fibrous papule of the nose is a harmless small bump on or near the nose. It is typically dome-shaped, skin-colored, white or reddish, smooth and firm. Less frequently it can occur elsewhere on the face. Sometimes there are a few. It may be shiny and remains unchanged for life. There may be a central hair.

The precise cause is unknown. It is a type of angiofibroma which originates in a dendrocyte in skin.

It is common, usually appearing in young adults and then remaining permanent.

== Diagnosis and treatment ==
Diagnosis is by visualisation, skin biopsy or histopathology of one that has been surgically cut out. Histopathology shows fibroblasts, fibrotic stroma, and large blood vessels. It can appear similar to a benign melanocytic naevus or an early BCC. It may be mistaken for a nevocytic nevus, neurofibroma, and pyogenic granuloma. The presence of several should alert to seeking for other signs of tuberous sclerosis.

Usually no treatment is necessary. Treatments for cosmetic reasons include shave excision and electrosurgery. Following treatment, recurrence is rare.

== See also ==
- Skin lesion
