= Pilar sheath acanthoma =

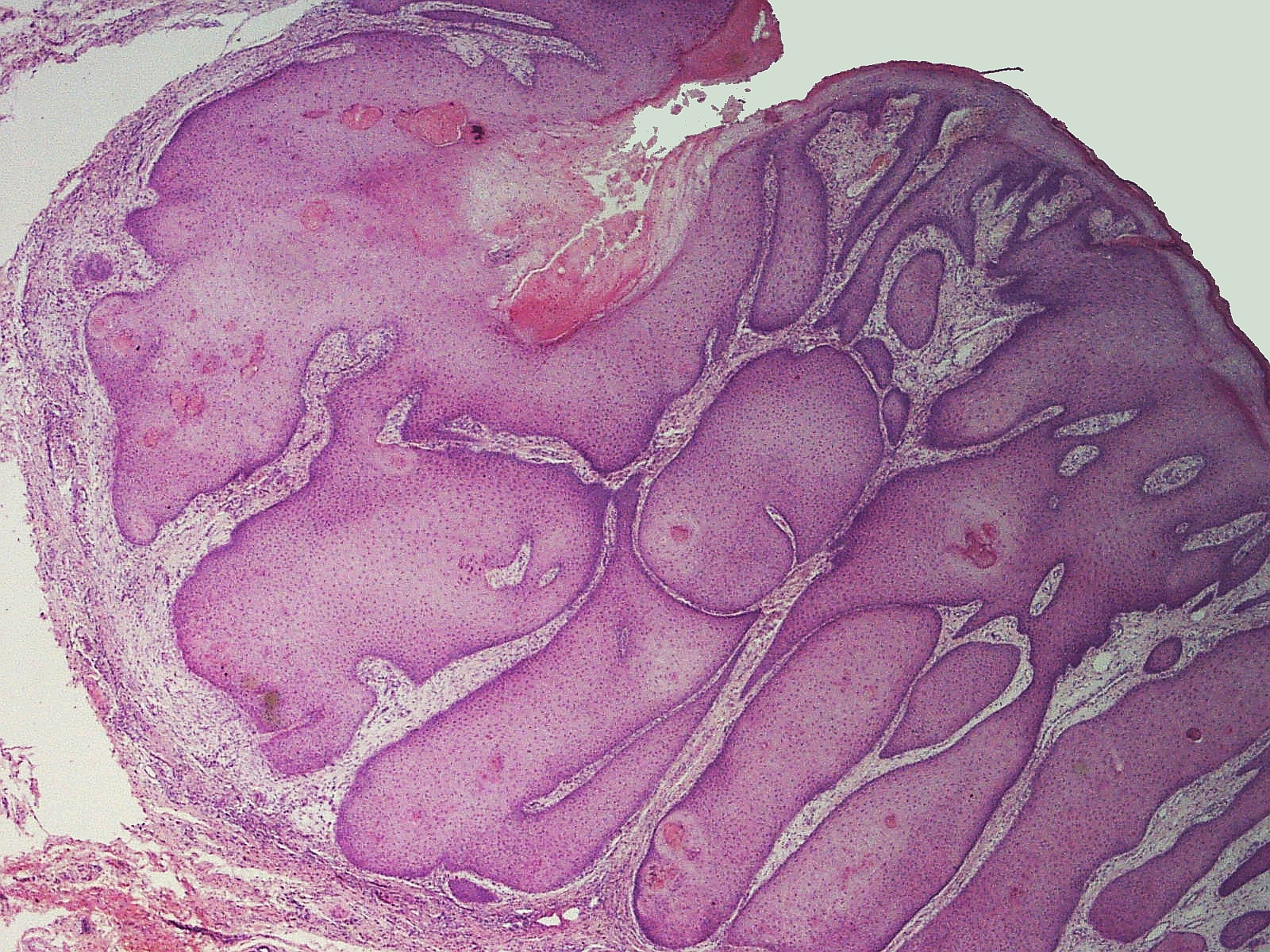
- Pilar sheath acanthoma
- Specialty: Oncology

A pilar sheath acanthoma is a cutaneous condition most often found on the face, particularly above the upper lip in adults. Pilar sheath acanthoma is a skin-colored, 5-10 mm diameter papule or nodule with a keratin-filled pore in the center. Pilar sheath acanthoma diagnosis confirmed by shave or excisional biopsy. Successful treatment requires surgical excision.

== Signs and symptoms ==
Pilar sheath acanthoma manifests as a single, skin-colored papule or nodule that is 5–10 mm in diameter and has a keratin-filled pore in the center. These lesions can occur anywhere on the head and neck, however they are typically nearly exclusively located on the upper lip.

== Diagnosis ==
Confirmation of the diagnosis is aided by a shave or excisional biopsy of the lesion. It is possible to confuse pilar sheath acanthoma with large comedones, trichoepithelioma, solar comedones (Favre-Racouchot syndrome), dilated pores (Winer), or scars.

Histopathologically, pilar sheath acanthoma is characterized by a centrally located, cystically dilated follicle that opens to the surface and contains keratinous material. Squamous epithelium buds extend outward from the central hole. The outer rooth sheath epithelium that makes up tumor lobules extends into the nearby dermis and may even reach the subcutis. Possible observations include infundibular keratinization of the epithelium and individual tumor cells with high glycogen content.

== Treatment ==
The only successful treatment is surgical excision.

== See also ==
- Dilated pore
- Trichoadenoma
