= Trichoadenoma =

- Other names: Trichoadenoma of Nikolowski
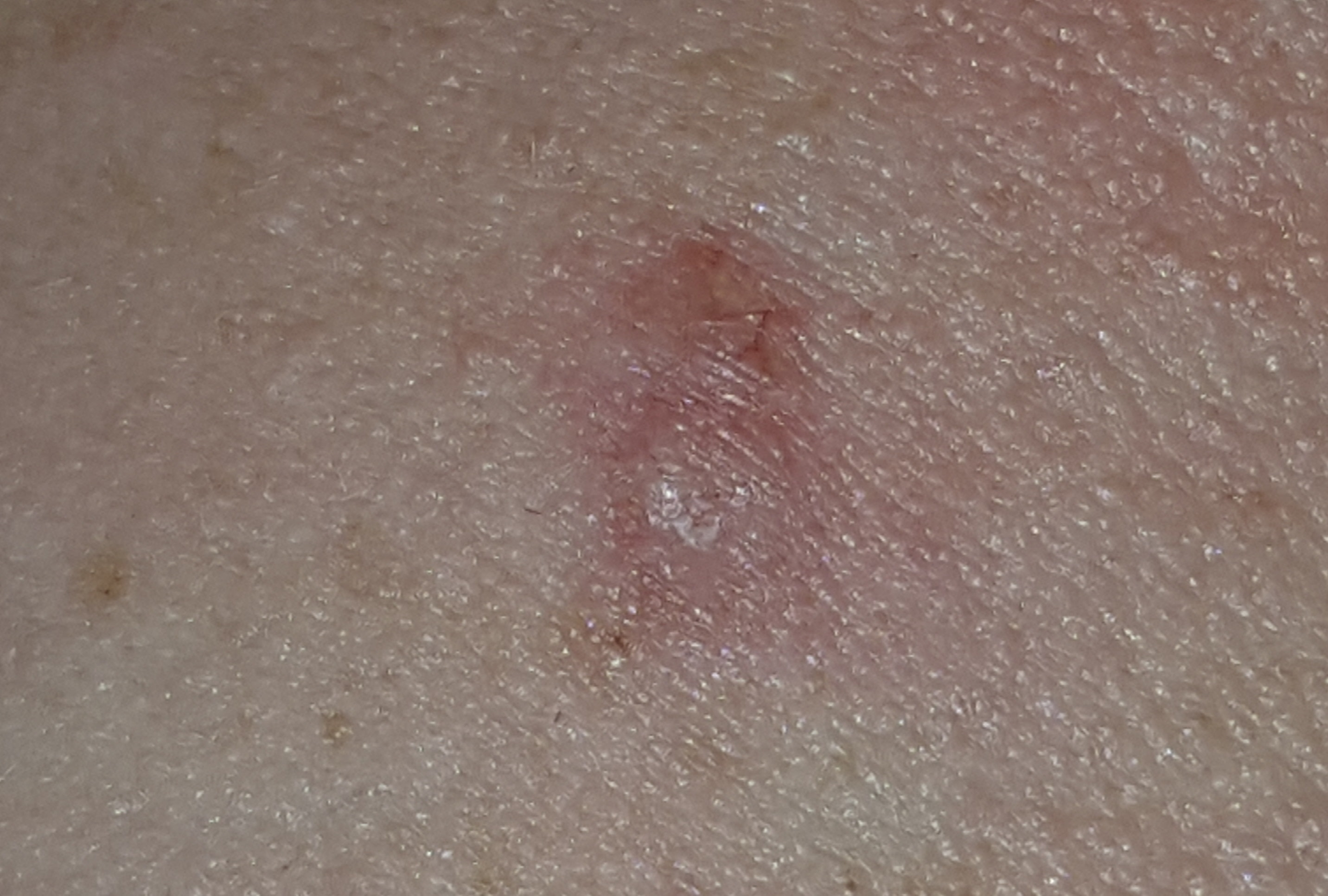
- Specialty: Oncology, dermatology

A trichoadenoma is a cutaneous condition characterized by a solitary, rapidly growing skin lesion ranging from 3 to 15mm in diameter.

== See also ==
- Dilated pore
- Pilar sheath acanthoma
- Skin lesion
- List of cutaneous conditions
