= Waxy keratosis of childhood =

- Specialty: Dermatology

Waxy keratosis of childhood (also known as "Kerinokeratosis papulosa") is a keratotic, flesh-colored papule that is either sporadic or familial, and may be generalized or segmental.

== See also ==
- Epidermis
- Skin lesion
