= Urticarial erythema multiforme =

- Specialty: Dermatology

Urticarial erythema multiforme is an unusual reaction virtually always associated with antibiotic ingestions, characterized by skin lesions that consist of urticarial papules and plaques, some of which clear centrally forming annular lesions, but with no true urticarial lesions.

== See also ==
- Skin lesion
- List of cutaneous conditions
