= Post-vaccination follicular eruption =

- Specialty: Dermatology

Post-vaccination follicular eruption is a cutaneous condition that occurs 9 to 11 days following vaccination, and is characterized in multiple follicular, erythematous papules.

== See also ==
- Skin lesion
