= Connective tissue nevus =

- Other names: Collagenoma, Elastoma, and Shagreen patch
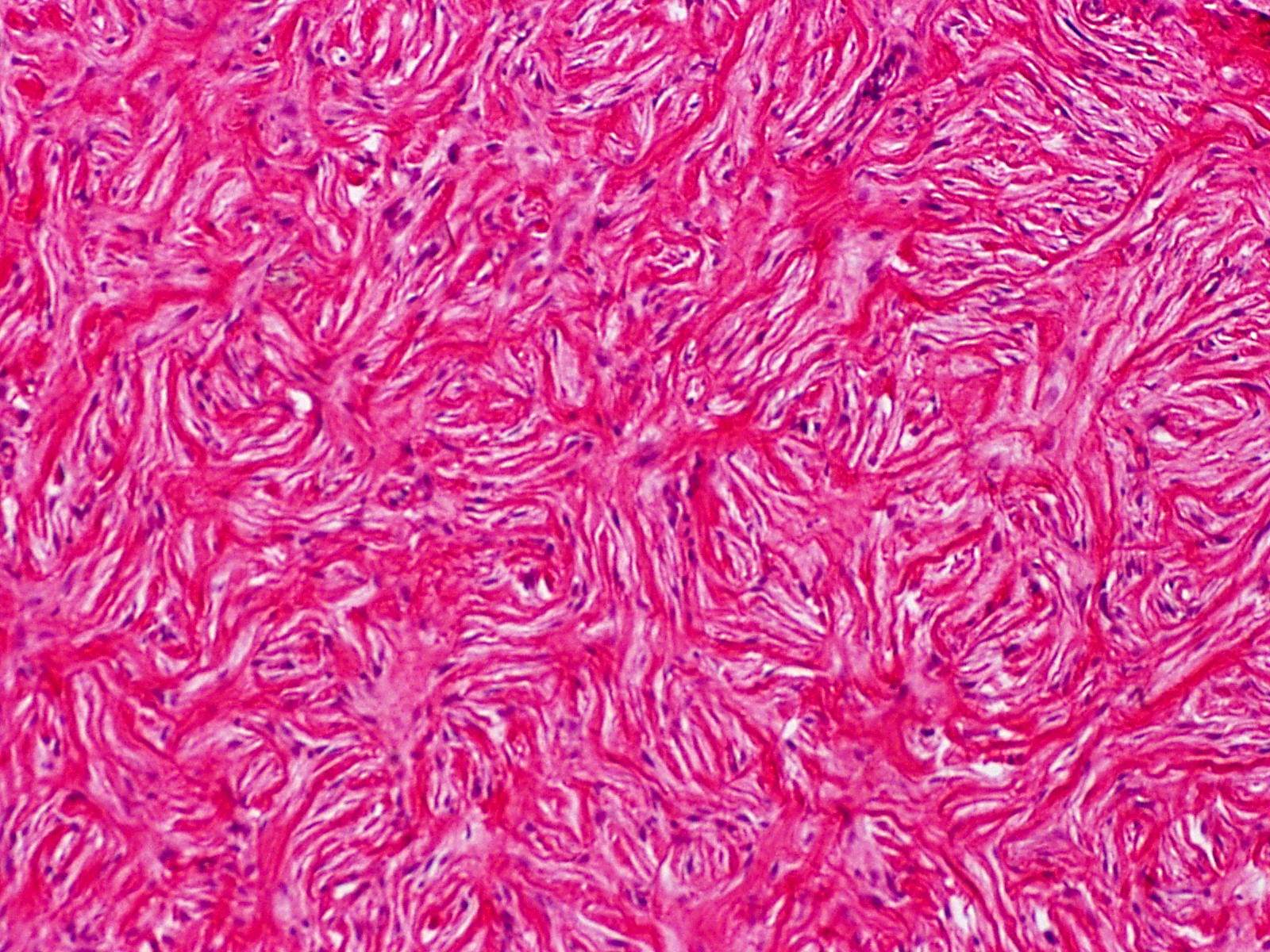
- Storiform collagenoma, H&E stain
- Specialty: Dermatology

A connective tissue nevus is a skin lesion which may be present at birth or appear within the first few years of life. It is elevated, soft to firm in consistency, varying in size from 0.5 to several centimeters in diameter, and may manifest as grouped, linear, or irregularly-distributed lesions.

== Signs and symptoms ==
Connective tissue nevi are thickened regions of skin that look as a series of skin-colored papules and plaques. The spots will become discolored in a yellowish manner as the skin covering them is stretched. Occasionally, they could seem red and have enhanced vascularity.

== Causes ==
The majority of reports are of random lesions, but there are some familial cases, indicating autosomal dominant transmission; some have been classified as Familial cutaneous collagenoma. Furthermore, connective tissue nevus can present as solitary lesions or be a component of systemic illnesses like tuberous sclerosis, which features shagreen's patches, another form of collagenoma, as an associated feature, or Buschke–Ollendorff syndrome, which is linked to collagenomas and elastomas.

== Diagnosis ==
In addition to hematoxylin-eosin staining to evaluate histological changes, lesion characteristics, genetic history, and special histochemical staining to highlight the composition of connective tissue nevus for differentiation, these tests are necessary for the diagnosis of connective tissue nevus.

== See also ==
- Skin lesion
- List of cutaneous conditions
