= Titanium metallic discoloration =

Skin condition

Titanium metallic discoloration has been reported to have occurred with titanium-containing ointment causing papules on the penis of a patient. Titanium screws used for orthopedic procedures, if they come near the skin, can also causes cutaneous blue-black hyperpigmentation.

== See also ==
- Skin lesion
