= Cutaneous focal mucinosis =

- Specialty: Dermatology

Cutaneous focal mucinosis is a skin condition characterized by a solitary nodule or papule.

== See also ==
- List of cutaneous conditions
