= Perifollicular fibroma =

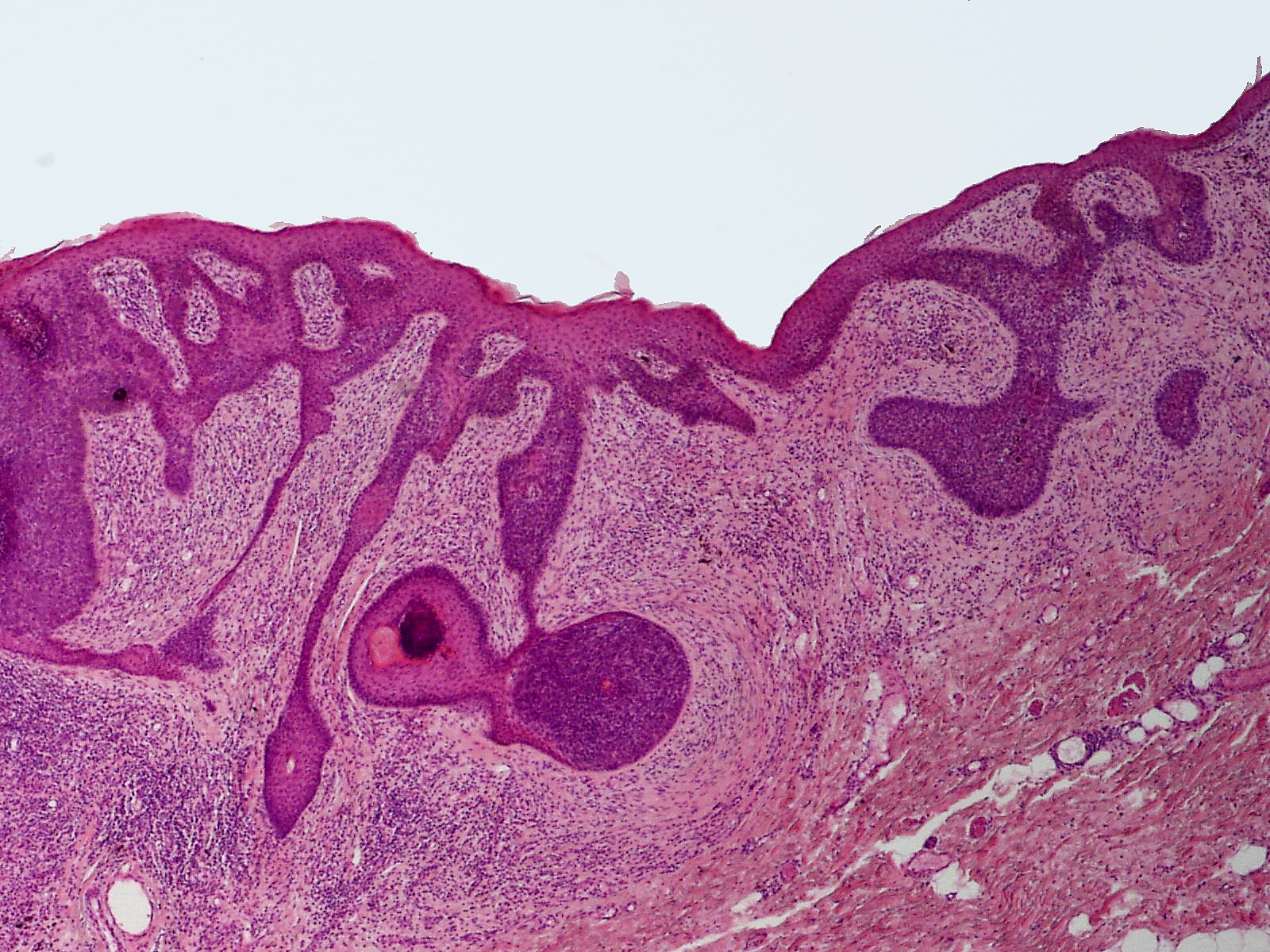
- Perifollicular fibroma
- Specialty: Dermatology

Perifollicular fibroma is a cutaneous condition, a benign tumor usually skin colored, most often affecting the face and upper trunk.

== See also ==
- Birt–Hogg–Dubé syndrome
- List of skin conditions
