= Adenoma sebaceum =

- Other names: Facial angiofibroma
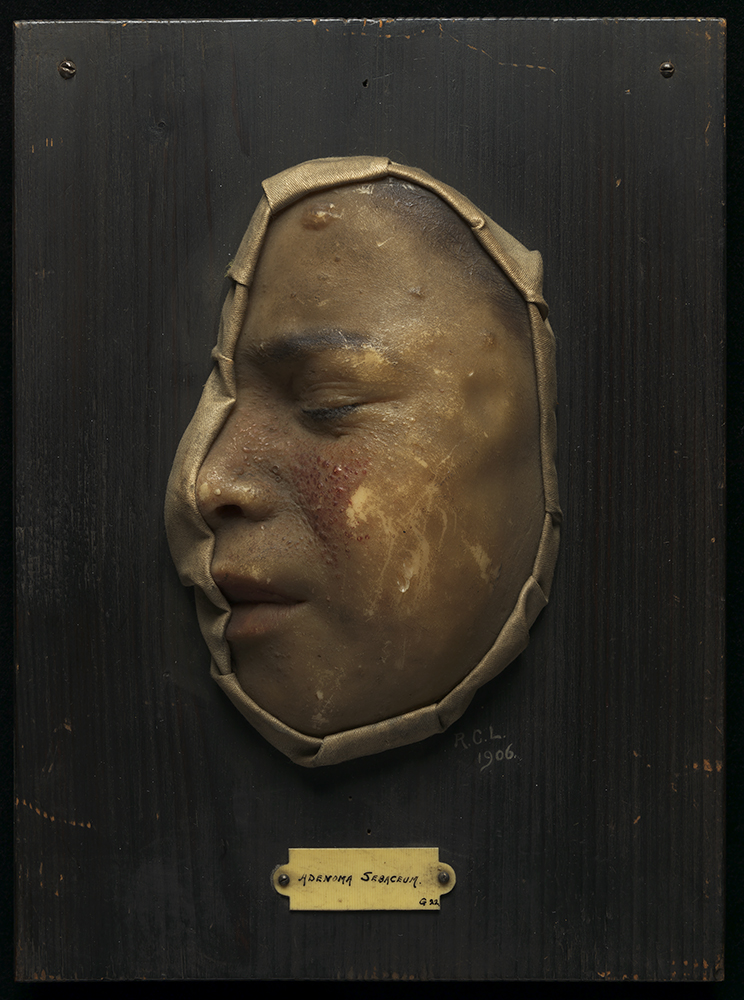
- Wax moulage, side view of a child's face showing 'adenoma sebaceum' (a genetic skin disorder), early twentieth century
- Specialty: Dermatology

Adenoma sebaceum, also known as facial angiofibroma, is a misnamed cutaneous disorder consisting of angiofibromas that begin in childhood (generally present between 2–5 years of age) and appear clinically as red papules on the face especially on the nasolabial folds, cheek and chin, often misidentified as acne not responding to treatment. Adenoma sebaceum may at times be associated with tuberous sclerosis. Gradually the papules become more prominent with time and persist throughout life. Cosmetic removal by argon or pulse dye laser or scalpel is indicated.

== Signs and symptoms ==
Adenoma sebaceum are several tiny, pinkish, erythematous hamartomas that cover the nose and cheeks in a distinctive butterfly pattern during early childhood or infancy. They typically occur in the nasolabial folds and are symmetrical.

== Diagnosis ==
Adenoma sebaceum presence represents one of the major diagnostic criteria to confirm the diagnosis of tuberous sclerosis. When adenoma sebaceum presents with seizures and mental retardation (Vogt's triad), it indicates that cranial imaging is necessary, other differential diagnoses for this disorder include acne vulgaris, rhinophyma, and sebaceous hyperplasia.

== Treatment ==
Adenoma sebaceum can be eliminated with dermabrasion or a laser.

== See also ==
- List of cutaneous conditions
- Tuberous sclerosis
