= Vestibular papillomatosis =

- Specialty: Dermatology, gynaecology
- Symptoms: Painless small bumps in genital area
- Complications: None
- Causes: Normal
- Treatment: None

Vestibular papillomatosis (VP) are normal small bumps in the genital area of females. The bumps appear in multiple numbers, are rounded and are not painful, itchy or uncomfortable. They are comparable to pearly penile papules, which occur in males.

VP are not infectious and not due to HPV. Diagnosis is by visualization. The bumps are less yellow and more pinkish when compared to Fordyce spots. They should not be mistaken for genital warts. No treatment is required.

They are common in pregnancy. Historically they were sometimes incorrectly called "microwarts".
