= Hair disc =

Receptor complex found in hairy skin

The hair disc is a receptor complex found in hairy skin.
