= FNIP1 =

Protein-coding gene in the species Homo sapiens

Identifiers
- Aliases: FNIP1, folliculin interacting protein 1, IMD93
- External IDs: OMIM: 610594; MGI: 2444668; GeneCards: FNIP1

Gene location (Human)
Chr.	Chromosome 5 (human)
Band	5q31.1	Start	131,641,714 bp
Band	5q31.1	End	131,797,017 bp

Gene location (Mouse)
Chr.	Chromosome 11 (mouse)
Band	11|11 B1.3	Start	54,329,025 bp
Band	11|11 B1.3	End	54,409,061 bp
RNA expression pattern
Bgee	Human / Mouse (ortholog); Top expressed in: cardiac muscle tissue of right atrium; myocardium of left ventricle; synovial membrane; Skeletal muscle tissue of rectus abdominis; corpus callosum; pancreatic epithelial cell; vastus lateralis muscle; pancreatic ductal cell; deltoid muscle; Achilles tendon / Top expressed in: intercostal muscle; soleus muscle; myocardium of ventricle; iris; spermatocyte; calvaria; stroma of bone marrow; gastrocnemius muscle; lobe of cerebellum; Region I of hippocampus proper; More reference expression data
BioGPS	n/a
Gene ontology
Molecular function	protein binding; guanyl-nucleotide exchange factor activity; ATPase inhibitor activity; chaperone binding
Cellular component	cytoplasm
Biological process	regulation of protein phosphorylation; regulation of pro-B cell differentiation; cellular response to starvation; negative regulation of TOR signaling; negative regulation of cysteine-type endopeptidase activity involved in apoptotic process; positive regulation of protein phosphorylation; negative regulation of transcription by RNA polymerase II; TOR signaling; positive regulation of B cell apoptotic process; positive regulation of protein-containing complex assembly; immature B cell differentiation; positive regulation of peptidyl-serine phosphorylation; mitochondrion organization; TORC1 signaling; negative regulation of mitochondrion organization; negative regulation of TORC1 signaling
Sources:Amigo / QuickGO
Orthologs
Databases	NCBI: entry; OMA: entry
Species	Human	Mouse
Entrez	96459	216742
Ensembl	ENSG00000217128	ENSMUSG00000035992
UniProt	Q8TF40	Q68FD7
RefSeq (mRNA)	NM_133372; NM_001008738; NM_001346113; NM_001346114	NM_173753
RefSeq (protein)	NP_001008738; NP_001333042; NP_001333043; NP_588613	NP_776114
Location (UCSC)	Chr 5: 131.64 – 131.8 Mb	Chr 11: 54.33 – 54.41 Mb
PubMed search
- Wikidata
View/Edit Human	View/Edit Mouse

Folliculin-interacting protein 1 (FNIP1) functions as a co-chaperone which inhibits the ATPase activity of the chaperone Hsp90 (heat shock protein-90) and decelerates its chaperone cycle. FNIP1 acts as a scaffold to load FLCN onto Hsp90. FNIP1 is also involved in chaperoning of both kinase and non-kinase clients.

== Co-chaperone function ==
FNIP1 does not have any known functional domains; however, based on amino acid sequence alignments, conserved regions were identified and named as A–D. The C-terminal domain of FNIP1 (amino acids 929–1,166 or fragment D) preferentially interacts with the middle domain of Hsp90. This fragment and the full-length FNIP1 are potent inhibitors/decelerator of Hsp90 ATPase activity. Small-molecule inhibitors that target the nucleotide-binding pocket of the N-terminal domain of Hsp90 also inhibit its ATPase activity and lead to degradation of the client proteins. However, FNIP1-mediated inhibition of Hsp90 ATPase activity appears to decelerate the chaperone cycle, not inhibit it completely, as overexpression of FNIP1 stabilizes and activates client proteins. This can also be reversed by the co-chaperone AHSA1, which is the activator of the Hsp90 ATPase function and competes with FNIP1 for binding to Hsp90.

== Post-translational regulation ==
Casein-kinase-2 mediated sequential phosphorylation of the co-chaperone FNIP1 leads to incremental inhibition of Hsp90 ATPase activity and gradual activation of both kinase and non-kinase clients. O-GlcNAcylation antagonizes phosphorylation of FNIP1, preventing its interaction with Hsp90, and consequently promotes FNIP1 ubiquitination and proteasomal degradation. Post-translational regulation of FNIP1 creates a rheostat for the molecular chaperone Hsp90.

== Clinical significance ==
Mutation of FNIP1 in mice causes a deficiency of B cells, and cardiomyopathy, with FNIP1 thought to act as a negative regulator of AMPK.
