= Dilated pore =

Human skin condition involving big blackheads

- Other names: Dilated pore of Winer
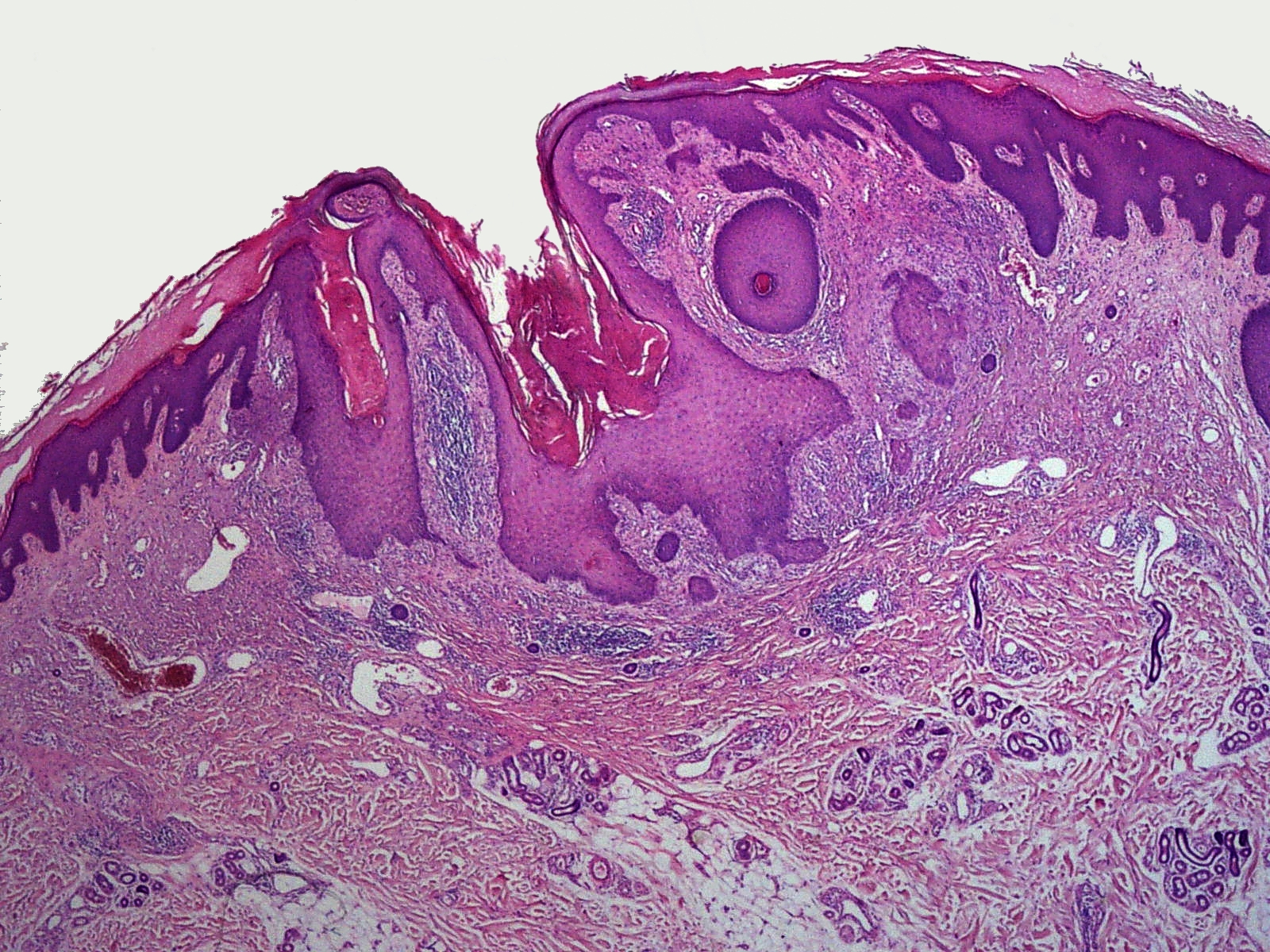
- Dilated pore of Winer
- Specialty: Dermatology

A dilated pore, also known as a dilated pore of Winer, is a cutaneous condition characterized by a solitary, prominent, open comedo on the face or upper trunk of an individual. Louis H. Winer is credited with discovering the dilated pore.

== See also ==
- List of cutaneous conditions
- Trichodiscoma
