= Skin tag =

Small benign skin tumor

- Other names: Acrochordon, acrochorda, skin polyp, fibroepithelial polyp, fibrovascular papilloma, soft fibroma, fibroma molle
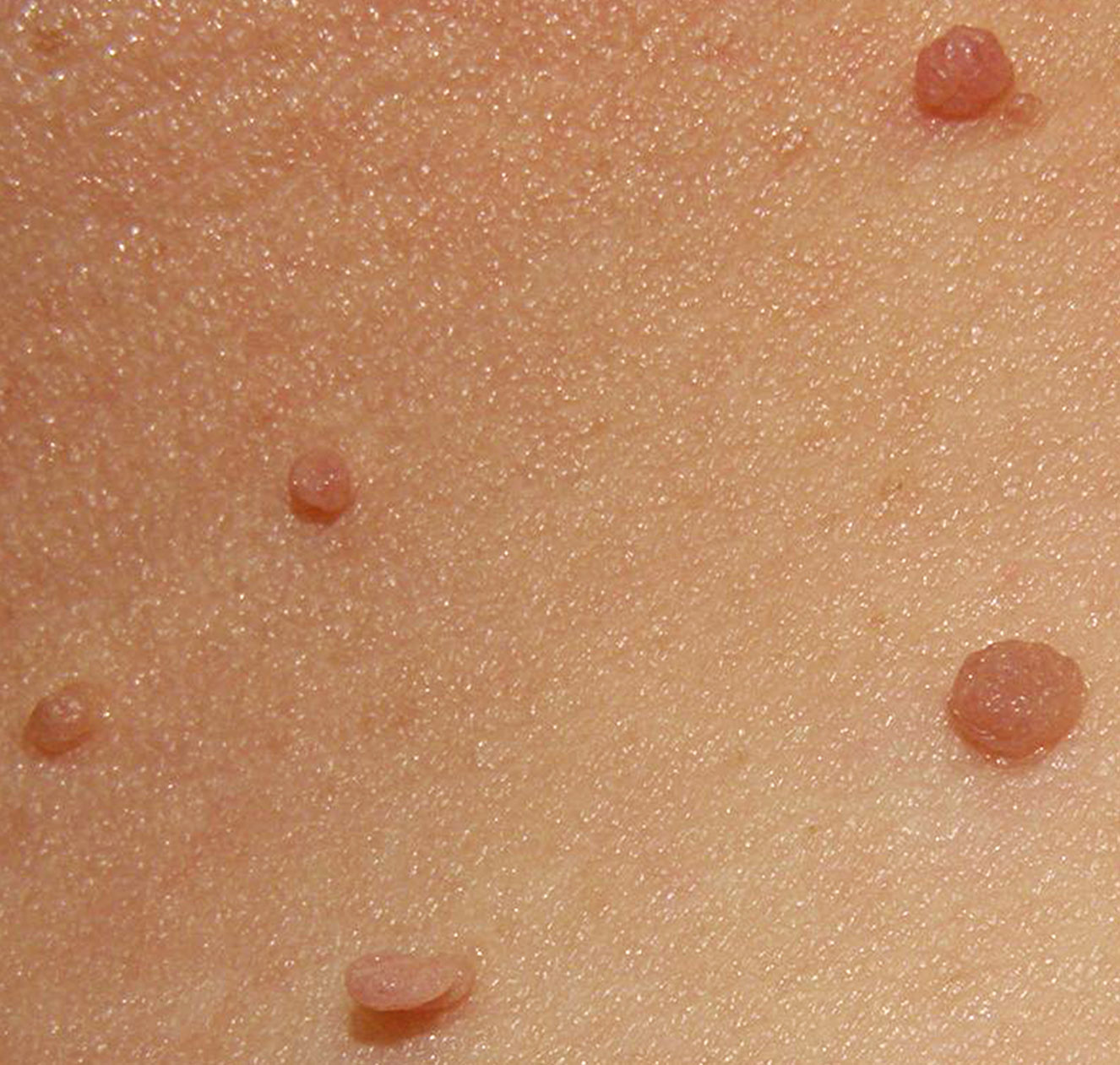
- Several acrochorda in the skin of the lower neck, with soft consistency, the bottom acrochordon taking a pedunculated shape
- Specialty: Dermatology

A skin tag is a small benign tumor that forms primarily in areas where the skin forms creases (or rubs together), such as the neck, armpit and groin. They may also occur on the face, usually on the eyelids. Though tags up to 13 mm (1/2 inch) long have been seen, they are typically the size of a grain of rice. The surface of an acrochordon may be smooth or irregular in appearance and is often raised from the surface of the skin on a fleshy stalk called a peduncle. They may become irritated by shaving, clothing, jewelry, or dermatitis.

Microscopically, it consists of a fibrovascular core, sometimes also with fat cells, covered by an unremarkable epidermis.

== Cause ==
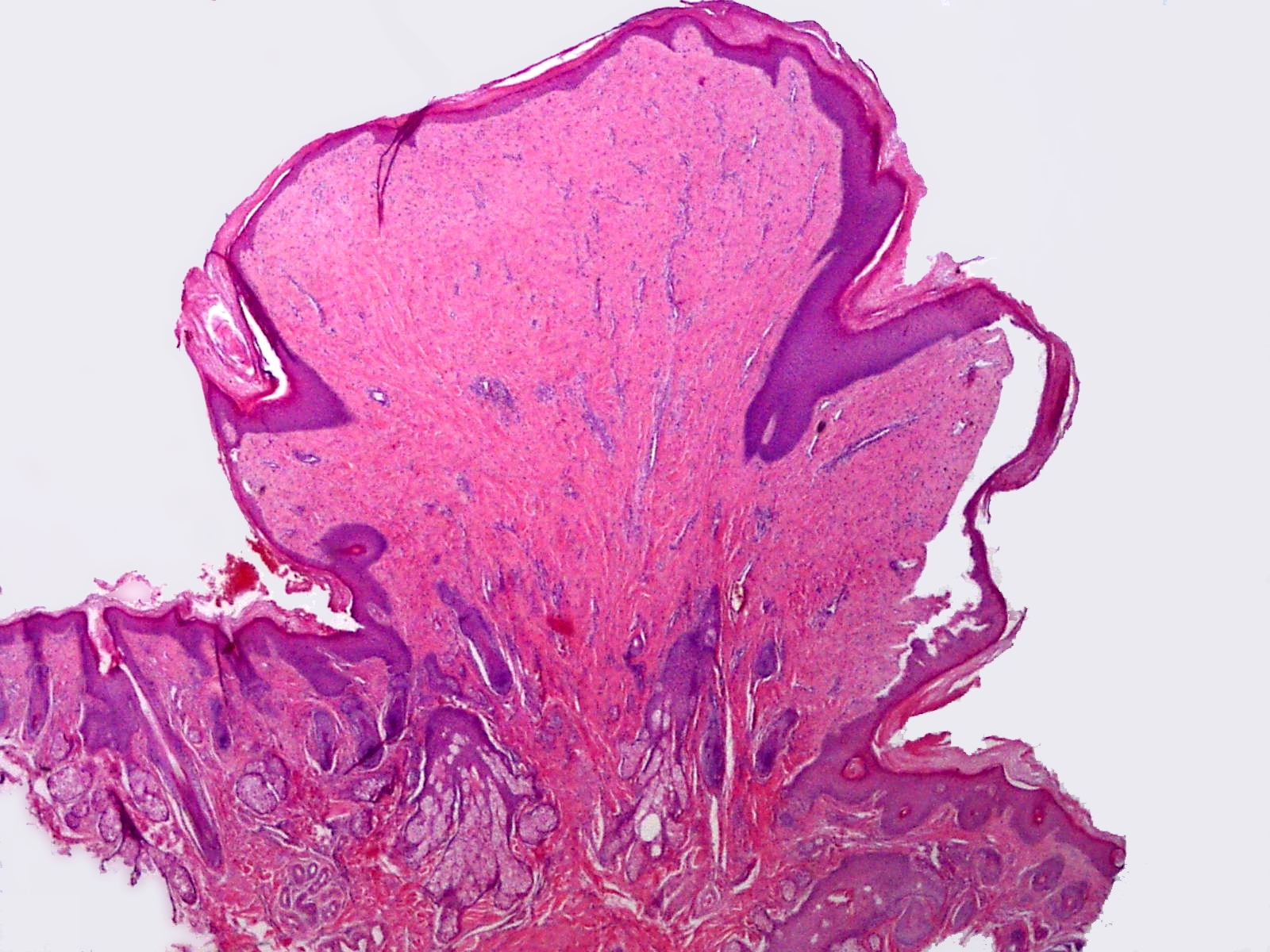
Pedunculated acrochordon, H&E stained to show its structure as a fibrous mass covered with epithelium of varied thickness

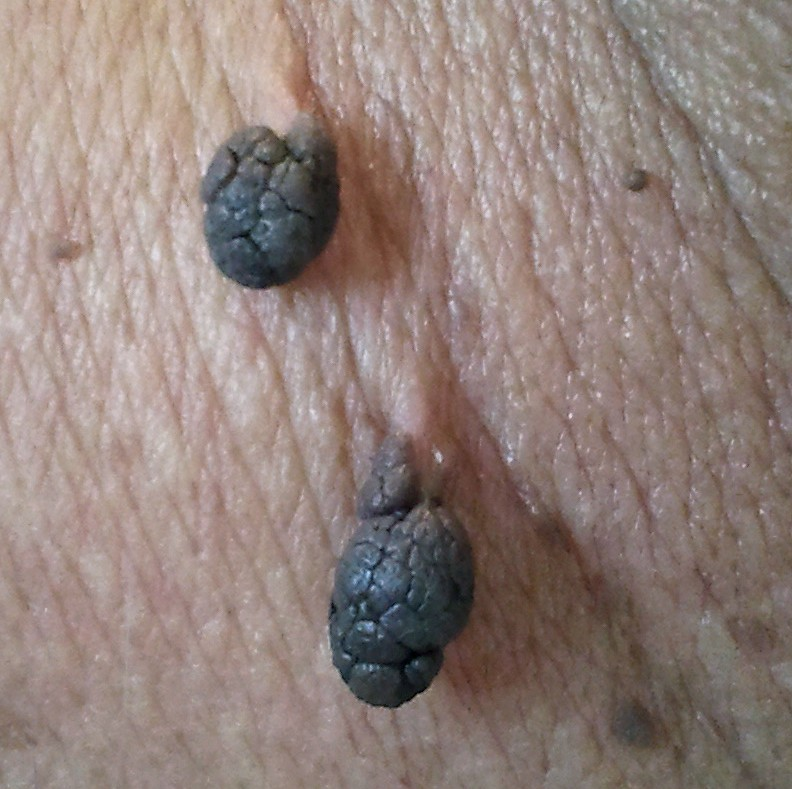
Close up of acrochordon

Skin tags are thought to occur from skin rubbing against skin, since they are often found in skin creases and folds. Studies have shown existence of low-risk human papillomaviruses 6 and 11 in skin tags, hinting at a possible role in their pathogenesis, although a 2012 study found no association between skin tags and either low- or high-risk HPV.

A causal genetic component is thought to exist. They were once thought to be associated with colorectal polyps, but studies have shown no such connection exists. Rarely, they can be associated with Birt–Hogg–Dubé syndrome, acromegaly, or polyendocrine metabolic ovarian syndrome.

Elevated blood sugar and insulin are linked to an increased incidence of skin tags through an unknown mechanism.

== Treatment ==
Removal, if desired, can be done by a dermatologist, a general practitioner, or a similarly trained professional who may use cauterization, cryosurgery, excision, laser, or surgical ligation. Varied home remedies are unsupported.

== Epidemiology ==
Acrochorda have been reported to have a prevalence of 46% in the general population. There is no link between acrochorda and gender.

== See also ==
- Cutaneous horn
- List of cutaneous neoplasms associated with systemic syndromes
- Molluscum contagiosum, a viral disease which is similar in appearance and grows in similar areas
- Papilloma
