= Familial cutaneous collagenoma =

- Specialty: Medical genetics
- Symptoms: Multiple flesh-colored nodules located on the trunk and upper arms
- Complications: None, although in some cases health complications have been reported as accompanying the disorder
- Usual onset: Adolescence
- Causes: Unknown, but there is a genetic basis
- Prevention: None
- Prognosis: good
- Frequency: uncommon
- Deaths: -

Familial cutaneous collagenoma is an autosomal dominant genetic disorder characterized by the presence of multiple symmetric nodules on the trunk and upper arms in multiple members of the same family. The nodules are flesh-colored, asymptomatic, and they start appearing during adolescent years. It has been described in 10 families worldwide.

These nodules are caused by an overgrowth of collagen fibers with an accompanying decreased number of elastic fibers.

In some cases, this condition is associated with anomalies in other parts of the body.

== Genetics ==
In a 2-generation Israeli Jewish family (whose affected members were two biological cousins), Hershkovitz et al. found a heterozygous mutation in the LEMD3 gene in both cousins and in the unaffected father of one of them.

== Possibly related complications ==
In 1968, Henderson et al. described 3 American brothers with the condition, and found that each one of them had health complications: the first brother suffered from idiopathic cardiomyopathy, the second suffered from iris atrophy of the left eye with accompanying severe high-frequency deafness, and the third suffered from recurrent vasculitis.
