= Benign melanocytic nevus =

Non-cancerous skin mole

- Other names: Banal nevus, Common acquired melanocytic nevus, Mole, Nevocellular nevus, and Nevocytic nevus.
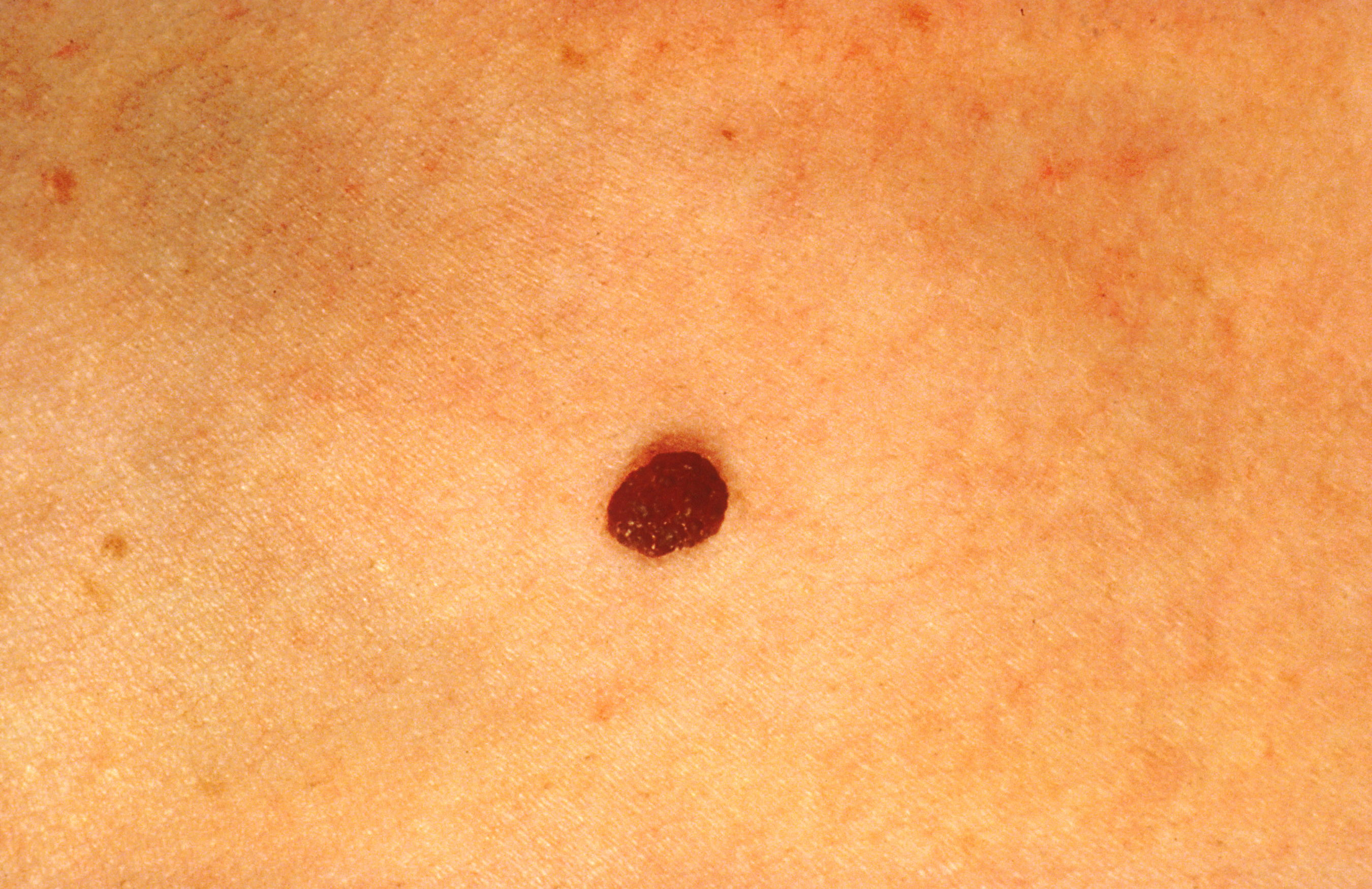
- Seen is a normal mole, with no difference in shades of brown, black, or tan. Part of the ABCDs for detection of melanoma.
- Specialty: Dermatology
- Types: Junctional, intradermal, and compound.

A benign melanocytic nevus is a cutaneous condition characterised by well-circumscribed, pigmented, round or ovoid lesions (also called "moles"), generally measuring from 2 to 6 mm in diameter. A benign melanocytic nevus may feature hair or pigmentation as well.

== Types ==
The three most common categories of benign melanocytic nevi are those located at the border between the epidermis and dermis (junctional nevi), intradermal nevi in the dermis only, and those found in both the dermis and epidermis (compound nevi).

Types of benign melanocytic nevi
	Height	Color
Junctional	Flat	Brown-black
Intradermal	Slightly elevated	Light brown-brown
Compound	Dome-shaped	Flesh-colored or brown

== Epidemiology ==
This skin lesion is quite common in the population, and it can present at birth, known as a congenital meloncytic nevus, or later in life as an acquired nevus. Should the nevi appear in toddler- or school-aged children, they are more likely to remain present throughout the rest of that person's life. If they arise in adolescence and adulthood, the nevi most likely occur due to sun damage. With appropriate coverage from the sun, these lesions may go away over time. Also, lighter-skinned people tend to have nevi more frequently than dark-skinned people.

== Link to melanoma ==
There is a distinction between a benign melanocytic nevus and melanoma, a type of skin cancer. Both of these conditions originate from the same type of cell: the melanocyte. However, a melanocytic nevus is benign, and melanoma is malignant. Most melanocytic nevi never evolve into a cancer, with the lifetime risk for an individual nevus being 1 in 3000 for men and 1 in 11 000 for women. Moreover, dermatologists have a standardized system for determining whether a skin lesion is suspicious for melanoma. It is as follows:

Differentiating mole from melanoma (ABCDE)
A	Asymmetry One half of the lesion does not look like the other
B	Borders The edges of the lesion are jagged or blurred
C	Color (variegation) The color of the lesion is not uniform; instead, it feature multiple colors
D	Diameter The lesion is greater than 1/4 inch or 6 mm from one side to the other
E	Evolution The lesion changes in appearance over time, such as in size or color

The above table features each warning sign for suspected melanoma. If a person notes that they have a skin lesion with some of these characteristics, a dermatologist would be able to help them with further evaluation. If melanoma is detected and treated early before it spreads in a process called metastasis, it carries a good prognosis.

== See also ==
- Becker's nevus
- List of cutaneous conditions
