= Angiofibroma =

Class of benign skin and mucous membrane lesions

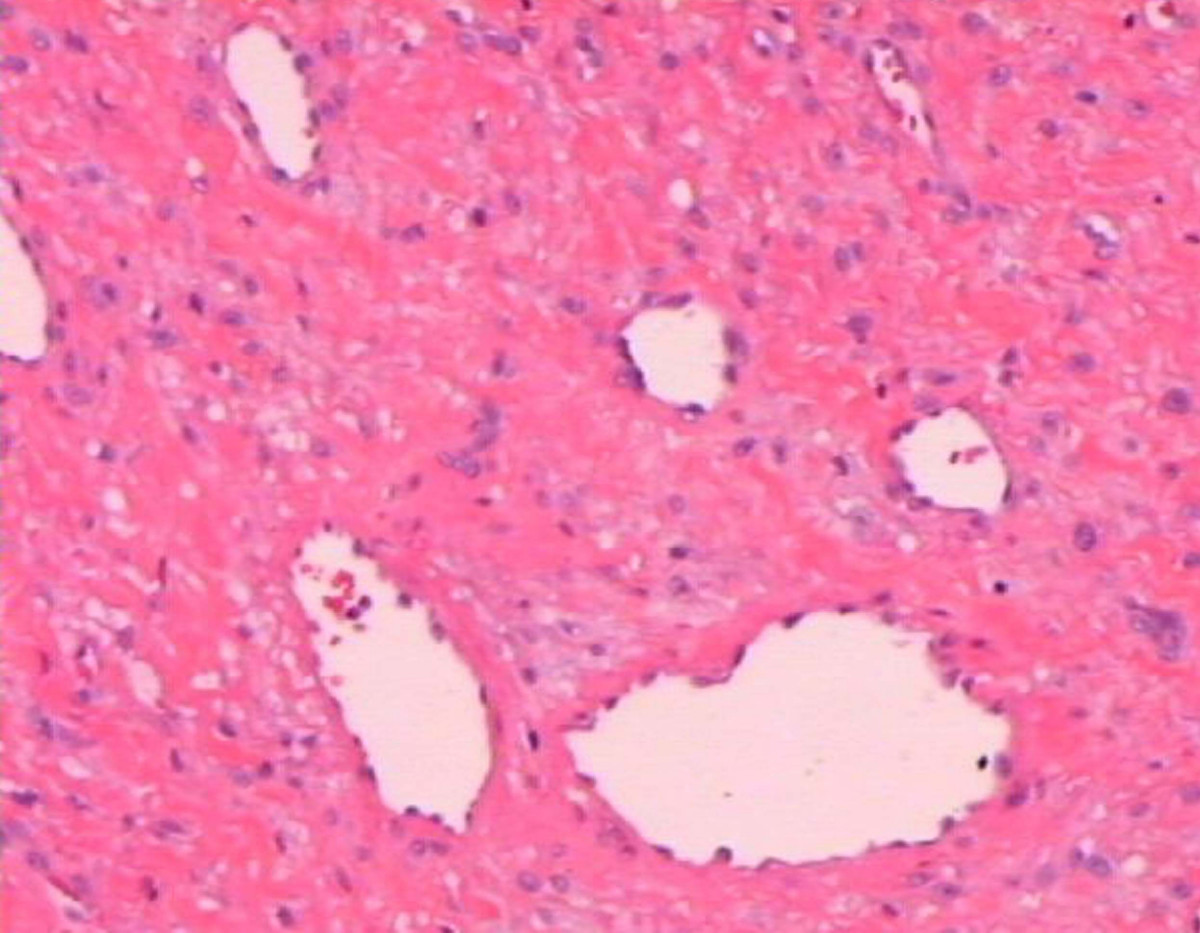
- Angiofibroma, Hematoxylin and eosin stain, magnification ×10.
- Specialty: Oncology
- Symptoms: Itchiness and sometimes bleeding.
- Complications: Facial disfigurement and stigmatization.
- Causes: Local overgrowth of collagen, fibroblasts, and blood vessels.
- Risk factors: Tuberous sclerosis, Birt-Hogg-Dubé syndrome, and Multiple endocrine neoplasia type 1.
- Diagnostic method: Skin biopsy.
- Differential diagnosis: Intradermal melanocytic naevus, Acne, Basal cell carcinoma, Viral warts, Subungual exostosis, Molluscum contagiosum, and Anogenital warts.
- Treatment: Excision, Dermabrasion, Using lasers, electrical, and radiofrequency devices, Cryotherapy, Topical podophyllotoxin, Topical rapamycin, and Topical beta-blockers.

Angiofibroma (AGF) is a descriptive term for a wide range of benign skin or mucous membrane (i.e. the outer membrane lining body cavities such as the mouth and nose) lesions in which individuals have:

1. benign papules, i.e. pinhead-sized elevations that lack visible evidence of containing fluid;
2. nodules, i.e. small firm lumps usually > 1 mm in diameter; and/or
3. tumors, i.e. masses often regarded as ~8 mm or larger.

== Diagnosis ==
AGF lesions share common macroscopic (i.e. gross) and microscopic appearances. Grossly, AGF lesions consist of multiple papules, one or more skin-colored to erythematous, dome-shaped nodules, or usually just a single tumor. Microscopically, they consist of spindle-shaped and stellate-shaped cells centered around dilated and thin-walled blood vessels in a background of coarse bundles of collagen (i.e. the main fibrous component of connective tissue). Angiofibromas have been divided into different types but commonly a specific type was given multiple and very different names in different studies.

=== Cutaneous angiofibroma ===
These papule, nodule, and/or tumor lesions occur on the: 1) face and are typically termed fibrous papules; 2) penis and are typically termed pearly penile papules; and 3) underneath a fingernail or toenail and are typically termed periungual angiofibromas. Some of these cutaneous AGF lesions occur in individuals with one or more of 3 different genetic diseases: tuberous sclerosis, multiple endocrine neoplasia type 1, and Birt-Hogg-Dube syndrome. The following are examples of these cutaneous angiofibromas and their alternate names.

==== Fibrous papules ====
Fibrous papules are also termed facial angiofibromas and were formerly and incorrectly termed adenoma sebaceum (fibrous papules are unrelated to sebaceous glands). They develop in up to 8% of the general adult population and occur as 1 to 3 pink to red, dome-shaped papules in the central areas of the face, nose, and/or lips. About 75% of individuals with tuberous sclerosis present with fibrous papules in their infancy or early childhood; when associated with this rare disease, the lesions often occur as multiple papules in symmetrical, butterfly-shaped patterns over both cheeks and the nose. Fibrous papules also occur in individuals with multiple endocrine neoplasia type 1 (a study done in Japan found that 43% of individuals with this genetic disease bore facial angiofibromas) and, uncommonly, in individuals with Birt-Hogg-Dube syndrome.

==== Pearly penile papules ====
Pearly penile papules are also termed papillae coronae glandis and hirsutoid papillomas. The condition of having such papules or papillae is called hirsuties papillaris coronae glandis or papillomatosis coronae glandis or papillomatosis coronae penis. These lesions develop in up to 30% of males during their puberty or, less commonly, early adulthood. They typically occur as numerous white-colored to skin-colored papules located circumferentially around the corona of the penis or, less commonly, the ventromedial aspect of the corona near the penis's frenulum. (Vestibular papillomatosis, also named hirsutoid vulvar papillomas, vulvar squamous papillomatosis, micropapillomatosis labialis, and squamous vestibular micropapilloma, is the female equivalent of pearly penile papules in men. It has not been formally termed an angiofibroma.)

==== Periungual angiofibromas ====
Periungual angiofibromas are also termed Koenen's tumors, periungual fibromas, and subungual fibromas. In addition, these tumors were formerly regarded as a type of acral angiofibroma (see below description). These lesions present as multiple nodules or tumors under multiple finger and/or toe nails of individuals with tuberous sclerosis or in one case the Birt-Hogg-Dube syndrome. Periungual angiofibromas have also been reported to occur in individuals that do not have these genetic diseases. Periungual angiofibromas tumors can be highly mutilating finger/toe-nail lesions.

=== Oral fibromas ===
Oral fibromas are also termed irritation fibromas, focal fibrous hyperplasia, and traumatic fibromas. These lesions are nodules that occur on the buccal mucosa (i.e. mucous membranes lining the cheeks and back of the lips) or lateral tongue. They may be irritating or asymptomatic and are the most common tumor-like lesions in the oral cavity. Oral fibromas are not neoplasms; they are hyperplastic (i.e. overgrowth) reactions of fibrous tissue to local trauma or chronic irritation.

=== Nasopharyngeal angiofibromas ===
Nasopharyngeal angiofibromas, also termed juvenile nasopharyngeal angiofibromas, fibromatous hamartomas, or angiofibromatous hamartoma of the nasal cavity, are large benign tumors (average size 5.9 cm in one study) that develop almost exclusively in males aged 9 to 36 years old. They commonly arise in the nasopharynx (i.e. upper part of the throat that lies behind the nose) and typically have attachments to the sphenopalatine foramen, clivus, and/or root of the pterygoid processes of the sphenoid bone. These tumors may expand into various other nearby structures including the cranial cavity. Nasopharyngeal angiofibromas are highly vascularized tumors consisting of fibroblasts (i.e. connective tissue cells) in a dense collagen matrix (i.e. tissue background). Studies have suggested that these tumors are due to the expression of male sex hormones (i.e. androgens and progesterones), genetic factors, molecular alterations (i.e. changes in the normal characteristics of cells that lead to abnormal cell growth), and/or human papillomavirus infection.

=== Angiofibroma of soft tissue ===
Angiofibroma of soft tissue is also named angiofibroma, not otherwise specified, by the World Health Organization, 2020. The Organization also classified these lesions as in the category of benign fibroblastic and myofibroblastic tumors. These tumors more often afflict females, typically occur in adults (median age 49 years), have a median size of ~3.5 cm, and develop in a leg near to, and may invade, a large joint. Less uncommonly, they occur in the back, abdominal wall, pelvic cavity, or breast. Angiofibroma of soft tissue tumors consist of uniform, bland, spindle-shaped cells and a prominent vascular network consisting of small thin-walled branching blood vessels in a variably collagenous tissue background. Its tumor cells contain an AHRR-NCOA2 fusion gene in 60% to 80% of cases and a GTF2I-NCOA2 or GAB1-ABL1 fusion gene in rare cases.

=== Cellular angiofibroma ===
Cellular angiofibroma is usually a small, slow-growing tumor arising in the vulva-vaginal areas of adult woman and the inguinal-scrotal areas of adult men although some of these tumors, especially in men, can grow up to 25 cm. Affected men are usually older (7th decade) than women (5th decade). Less commonly. cellular angiofibromas have occurred in various other superficial soft tissue areas throughout the body. These tumors are edematous (i.e. abnormally swollen with fluid), highly vascular, spindle-shaped cell lesions with a variable amount of fibrous stroma. In 2020, the World Health Organization classified cellular angiofibroma tumors in the category of benign fibroblastic/myofibroblastic tumors. The tumor cells in these lesions contain chromosome and gene abnormalities including a loss of one of the two RB1 genes. It has been suggested that the loss of this gene contributes to the development of cellular angiofibroma tumors.

=== Acral angiofibromas ===
Acral angiofibromas are also termed superficial acral fibromyxomas, digital fibromyxomas, acquired digital fibrokeratomas, acquired periungual fibrokeratomas, garlic clove fibromas, digital fibromas, and cellular digital fibromas. At one time, periungual angiofibromas were regarded as a type of acral angiofibroma (see above description). Acral refers to distal sites of the ears, nose, hands, fingers, feet, and toes. Acral angifibromeae occur primarily in areas close to the nails of fingers and toes (~80% of cases) or, less commonly, palms of the hands or soles of the feet. The tissues of this tumor consists of bland spindle-shaped and star-shaped cells within a collagen fiber-rich stroma containing prominent blood vessels and mast cells.

Photos

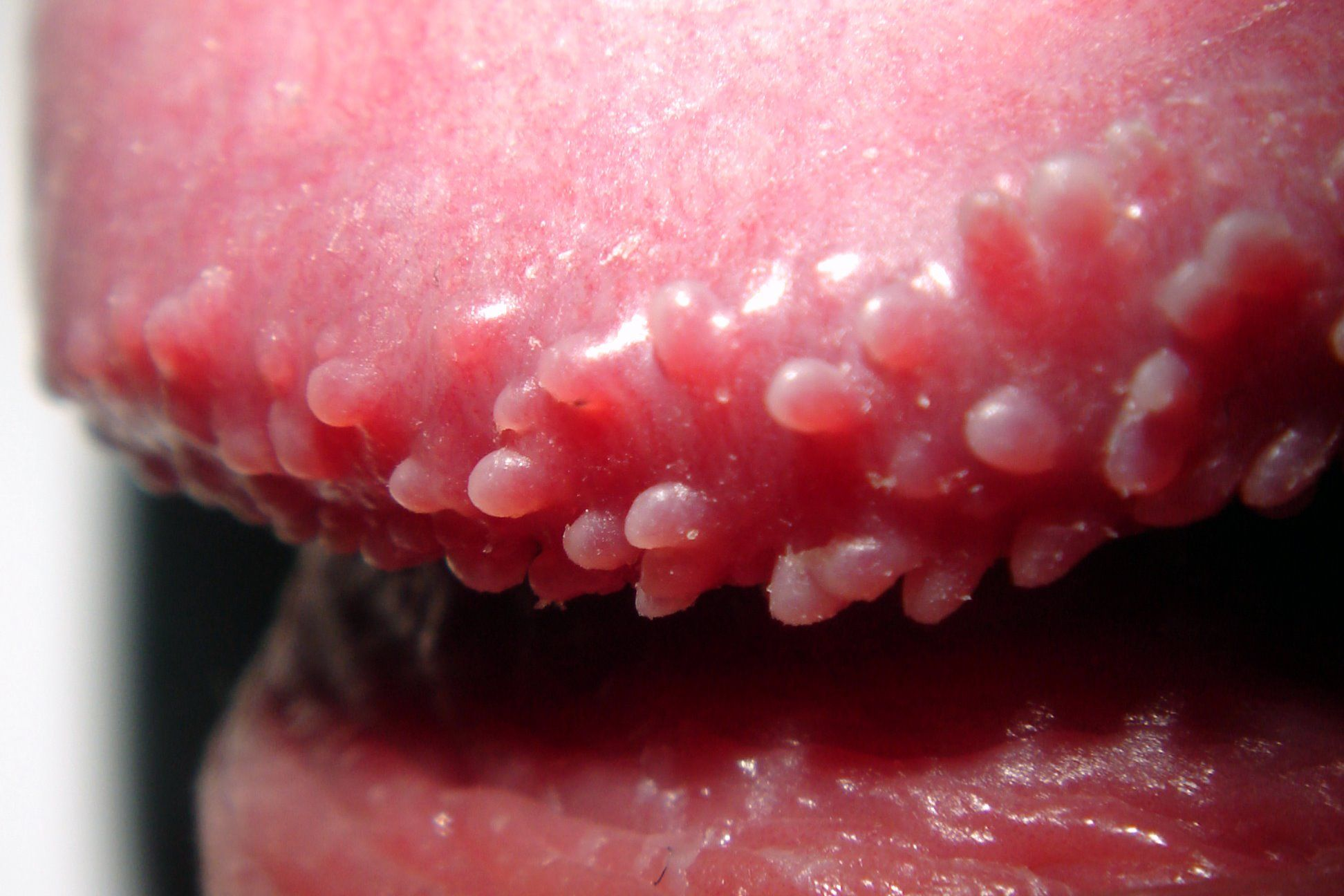
Glans penis with Hirsuties papillaris penis. Papules are common on uncircumcised penises.

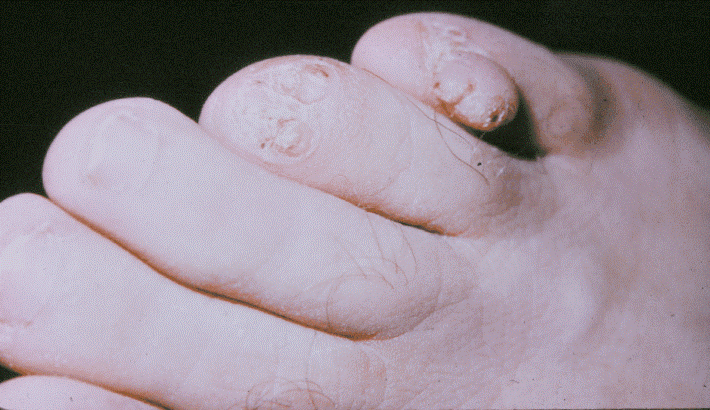
Koenen tumor in patient with tuberous sclerosis complex.

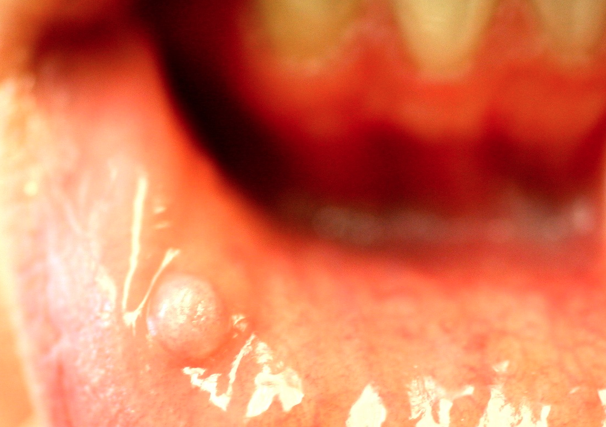
Photo of irritation fibroma on the labial mucosa.

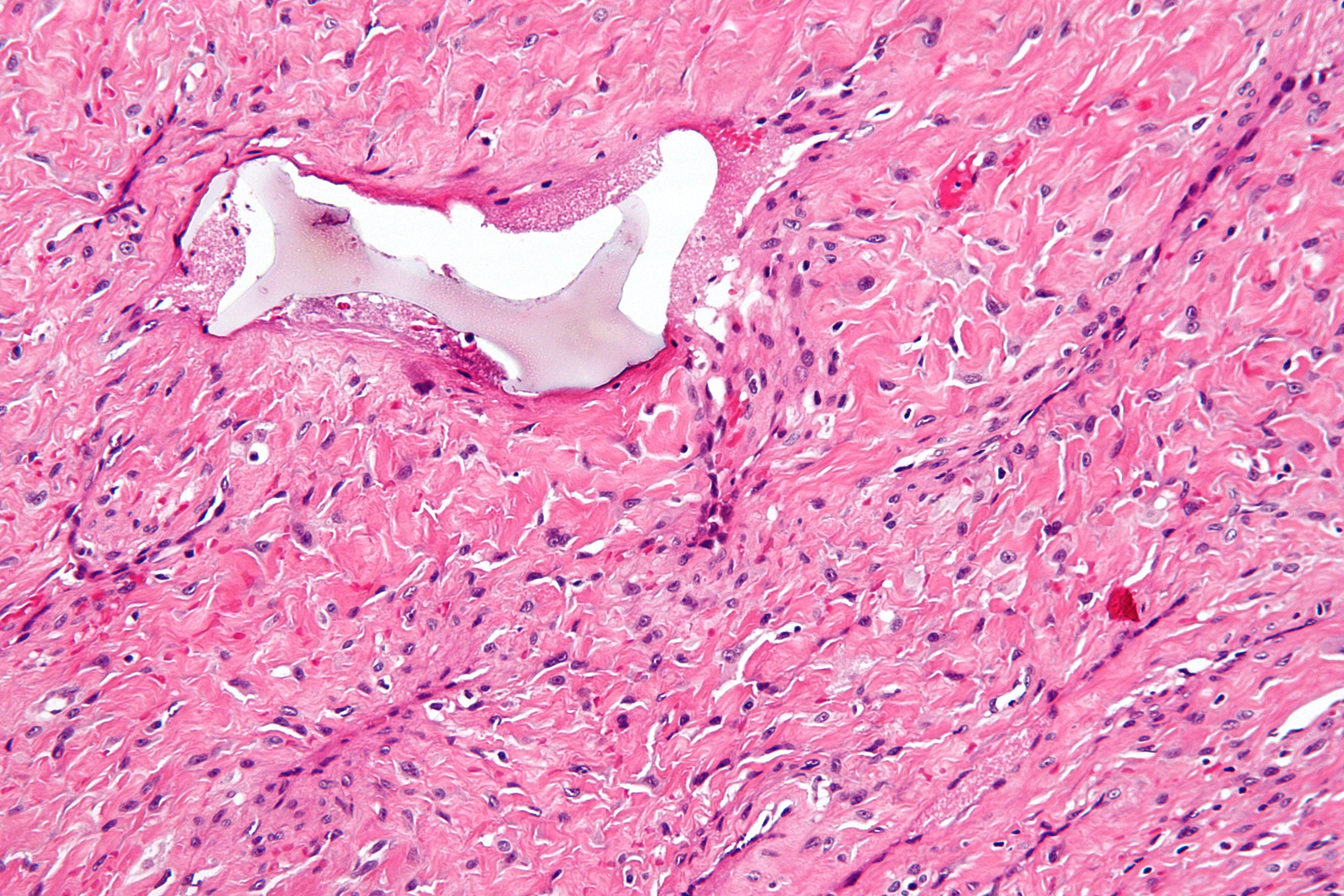
High magnification micrograph of a nasopharyngeal angiofibroma.

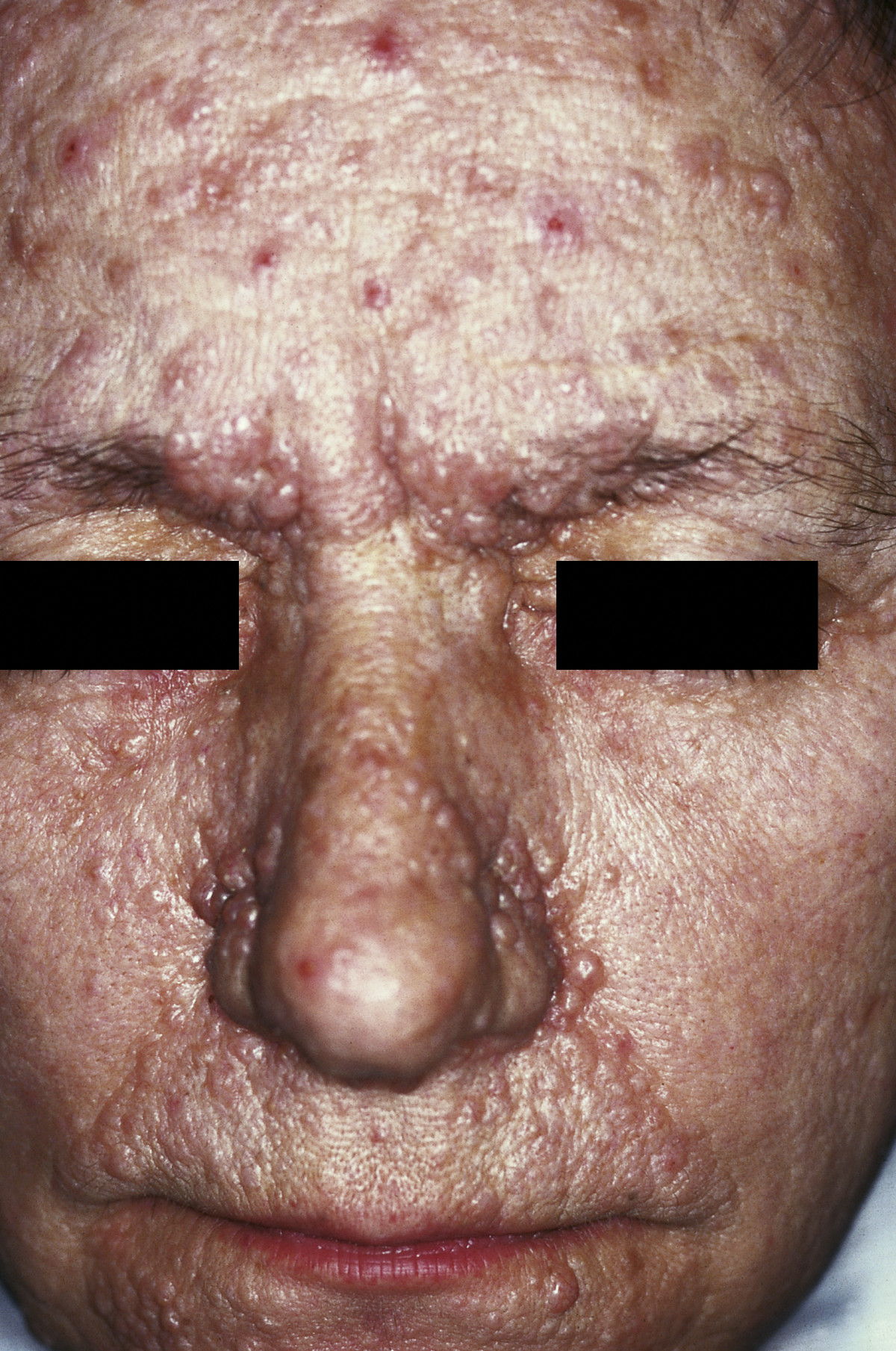
Adenoma sebaceum. Multiple wart-like, waxy lumps consisting of angiomatous and fibrous tissue associated with tuberous sclerosis.

== See also ==
- List of cutaneous conditions
- Tuberous sclerosis
- Multiple endocrine neoplasia type 1
- Birt-Hogg-Dube syndrome
