= Fibrofolliculoma =

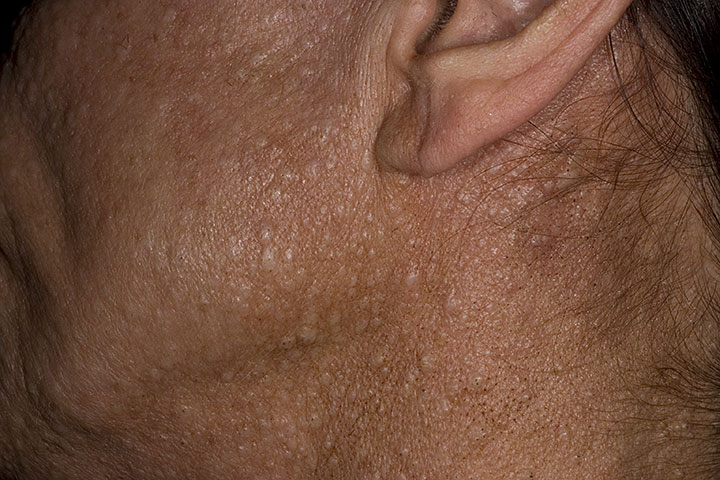
- Birt–Hogg–Dubé syndrome
- Specialty: Dermatology

Fibrofolliculomas are 2 to 4 mm in diameter, dome-shaped, yellowish or skin-colored papules usually located on the head, neck, and upper trunk. They are characteristically seen in Birt–Hogg–Dubé syndrome.

== See also ==
- List of cutaneous conditions
- List of cutaneous neoplasms associated with systemic syndromes
- Trichodiscoma
