= Trichodiscoma =

- Specialty: Oncology, dermatology

A trichodiscoma is a cutaneous condition, a benign, usually skin-colored tumor most often affecting the face and upper trunk.

== See also ==
- Birt–Hogg–Dubé syndrome
- Fibrofolliculoma
- List of cutaneous conditions
- List of cutaneous neoplasms associated with systemic syndromes
