= Papule =

Small, circumscribed, solid elevation of skin with no visible fluid

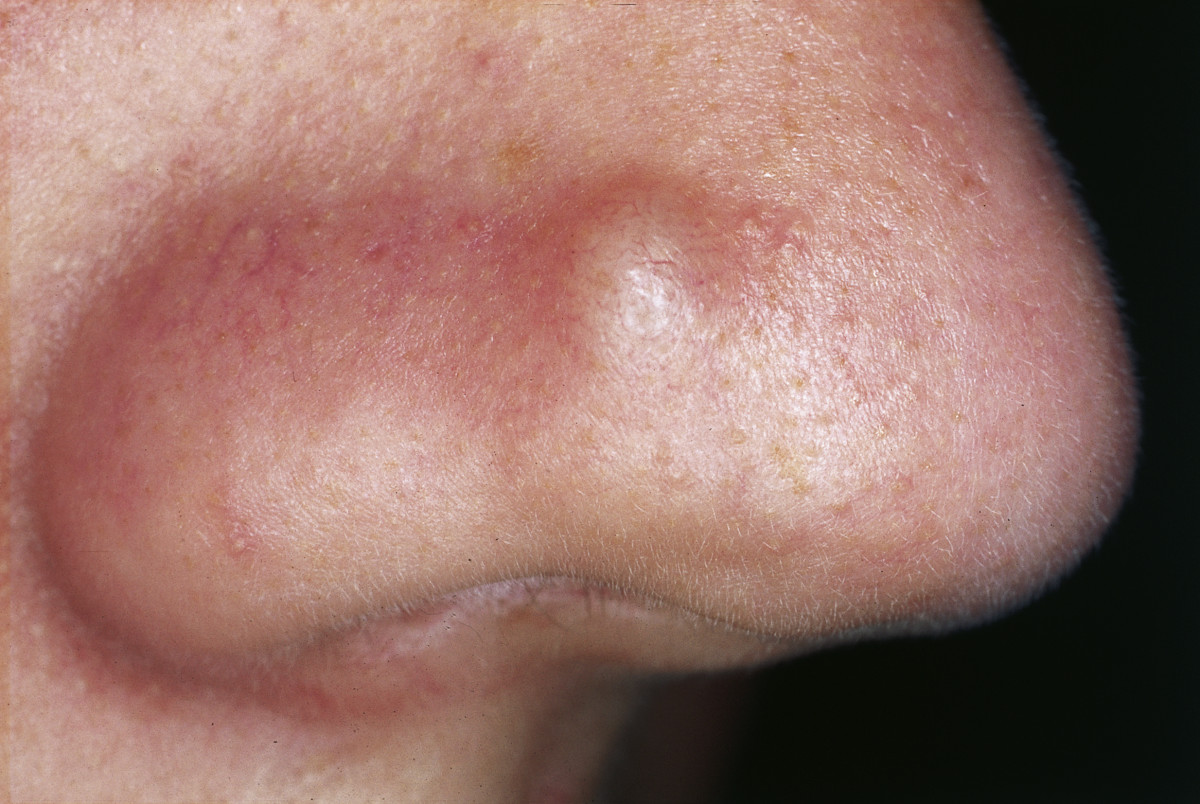
- Fibrous papule of the nose
- Pronunciation: /ˈpæpjuːl/
- Specialty: Dermatology
- Symptoms: Small, well-defined bump in skin

A papule is a small, well-defined bump in the skin. It may have a rounded, pointed or flat top, and may have a dip. It can appear with a stalk, be thread-like or look warty. It can be soft or firm and its surface may be rough or smooth. Some have crusts or scales. A papule can be flesh colored, yellow, white, brown, red, blue or purplish. There may be just one or many, and they may occur irregularly in different parts of the body or appear in clusters. It does not contain fluid but may progress to a pustule or vesicle. A papule is smaller than a nodule; it can be as tiny as a pinhead and is typically less than 1 cm in width, according to some sources, and 0.5 cm according to others. When merged together, it appears as a plaque.

A papule's colour might indicate its cause, such as white in milia, red in eczema, yellowish in xanthoma and black in melanoma. They may open when scratched and become infected and crusty.

== Definition ==
Papule and plaque

A papule is a small, well-defined bump in the skin. It is smaller than a nodule; it can be as tiny as a pinhead and is typically less than 1 cm (0.39 in) in width, according to some sources, and 0.5 cm (0.2 in) according to others.

== Evaluation ==
A papule may have a rounded, pointed or flat top, and may have a dip. It can be polygonal but is never rectangular or square. It can appear with a stalk, be thread-like or look warty. Ulceration, oozing, bleeding or thin blood vessels may be present in a papule. It can be soft or firm and its surface may be rough or smooth. Some have crusts or scales. A papule can be flesh colored, yellow, white, brown, black, blue or purplish, or varying shades of red. The intensity of redness might indicate how long the papule has been present. There may be just one or many, and they may occur irregularly in different parts of the body or appear in clusters. It may progress to a pustule or vesicle.

== Differential diagnosis ==
Angiofibromas are papules, types of which include the usually solitary fibrous papule of the nose and periungual angiofibroma, and multiple in pearly penile papules, and the facial angiofibromas as may be seen in tuberous sclerosis.

Papules with scale on the palms and soles may occur in secondary syphilis, psoriasis, eczema, tinea manuum, mycosis fungoides. In lichen planus papules may be itchy, flat-topped, polygonal, purplish with white streaks, and can be solitary, or occur in clusters or in a line.

== See also ==
- List of cutaneous conditions
