= Intravascular papillary endothelial hyperplasia =

- Other names: Masson's hemangio-endotheliome vegetant intravasculaire, Masson's lesion, Masson's pseudoangiosarcoma, Masson's tumor, and papillary endothelial hyperplasia
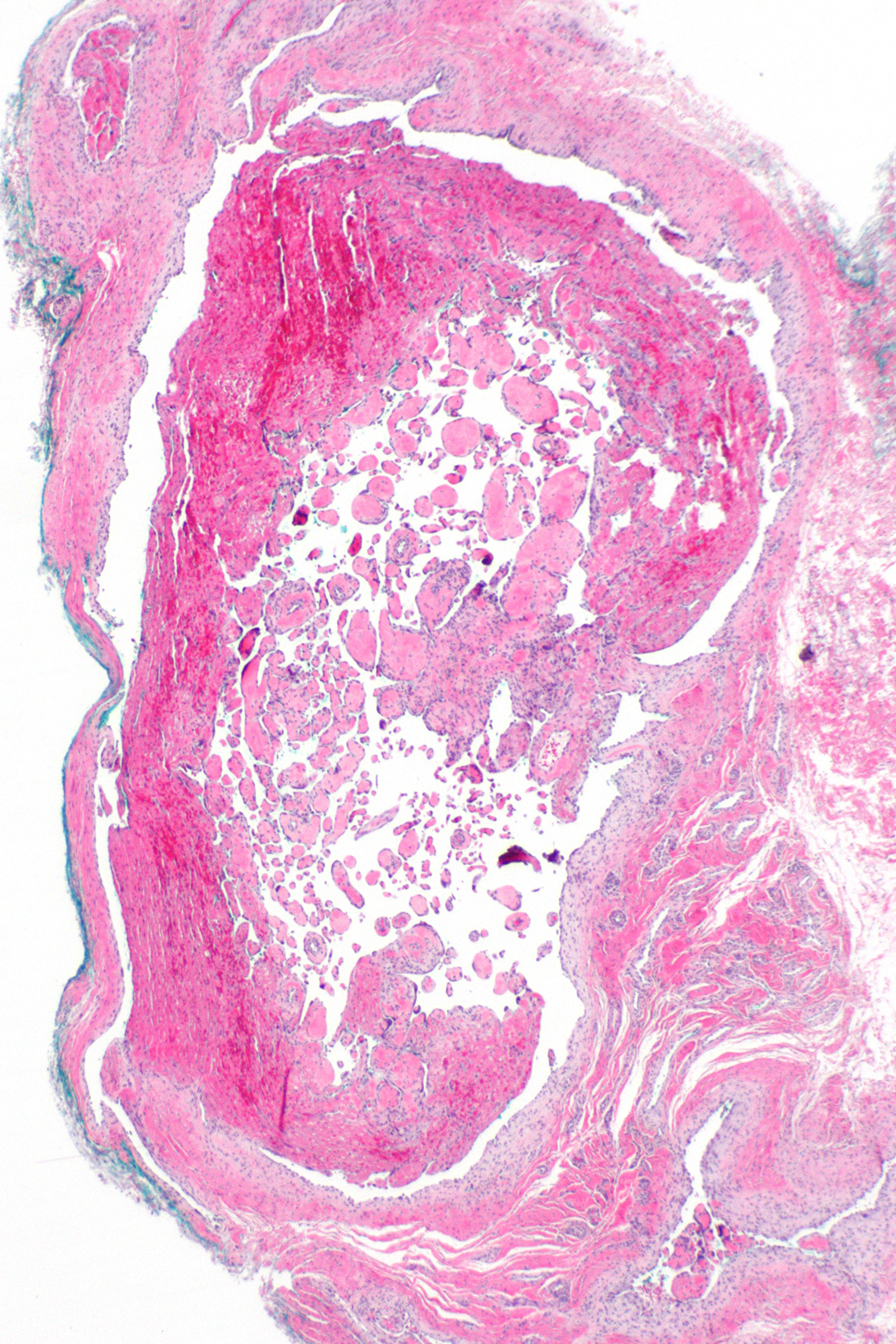
- Micrograph of intravascular papillary endothelial hyperplasia. H&E stain.
- Specialty: Oncology, rheumatology

Intravascular papillary endothelial hyperplasia (IPEH), also known as Masson's hemangio-endotheliome vegetant intravasculaire, Masson's lesion, Masson's pseudoangiosarcoma, Masson's tumor, and papillary endothelial hyperplasia, is a rare, benign tumor. It may mimic an angiosarcoma, with lesions that are red or purplish 5-mm to 5-cm papules and deep nodules on the head, neck, or upper extremities.

The cause of intravascular papillary endothelial hyperplasia is unknown. Risk factors include a history of local trauma or prior vascular disorders.

Immunohistochemistry and histopathology are used to make the diagnosis of intravascular papillary endothelial hyperplasia. Differential diagnosis includes vascular malformation, angioma, pyogenic granuloma, angiosarcoma, epithelioid hemangioendothelioma, Kaposi's sarcoma, and other more rare vascular tumors.

Three forms of intravascular papillary endothelial hyperplasia exist: the primary or pure form, the secondary or mixed form, and the extravascular form.

The treatment for intravascular papillary endothelial hyperplasia is complete surgical resection.

== Signs and symptoms ==
Intravascular papillary endothelial hyperplasia typically manifest as deep nodules or well-defined, round, red, or purple superficial papules. They are usually tiny, ranging in size from 0.5 to 5 cm. IPEH lesions are most common in the digits and among blood arteries throughout the body, although they can also form in the head, neck, and body. Atypical IPEH lesions have occasionally been seen in cerebral aneurysms or the abdominal organs.

== Causes ==
Although there are numerous possibilities, the pathophysiology and causation of intravascular papillary endothelial hyperplasia remain unknown. A history of local trauma or prior vascular disorders (such as hemangiomas, blood stasis, etc.) are risk factors. It will usually be idiopathic.

== Diagnosis ==
Immunohistochemistry staining in addition to a thorough histomorphological evaluation are necessary for a correct diagnosis. A crucial tool for diagnosing it is microscopy. IPEH is made up of an intravascular proliferation of many papillae with an endothelial surface and a connective tissue core. It differs from other neoplastic lesions in that it is often encapsulated or well-circumscribed, displaying distinctive papillary fronds, and the vascular wall completely restricts the proliferative process.

Only in cases when the endothelium origin of the lesion is in doubt may immunohistochemical confirmation be necessary. In these situations, endothelial cell markers that would highlight the endothelium lining around the papillary tufts, such as von Willebrand factor, CD31, factor XIIIa, and CD43, may be employed.

The differential diagnosis includes vascular malformation, angioma, pyogenic granuloma, angiosarcoma, epithelioid hemangioendothelioma, Kaposi's sarcoma, and other more rare vascular tumors.

=== Classification ===
Three forms of intravascular papillary endothelial hyperplasia exist: the primary or pure form, the secondary or mixed form, and the extravascular form.

The most prevalent variety, known as the primary or pure form, develops in subcutaneous soft tissue and usually arises in a dilated channel, most commonly a vein rather than an artery. Preexisting vascular anomalies are found in the secondary/mixed presentation. Lastly, the least frequent form of hematomas is the extravascular variety.

== Treatment ==
Complete surgical resection is the course of treatment. Wide margins of excision are not indicated, although partial resection can lead to recurrence.

== See also ==
- List of cutaneous conditions
