= Vascular tumor =

Tumor originating from blood or lymph vessels

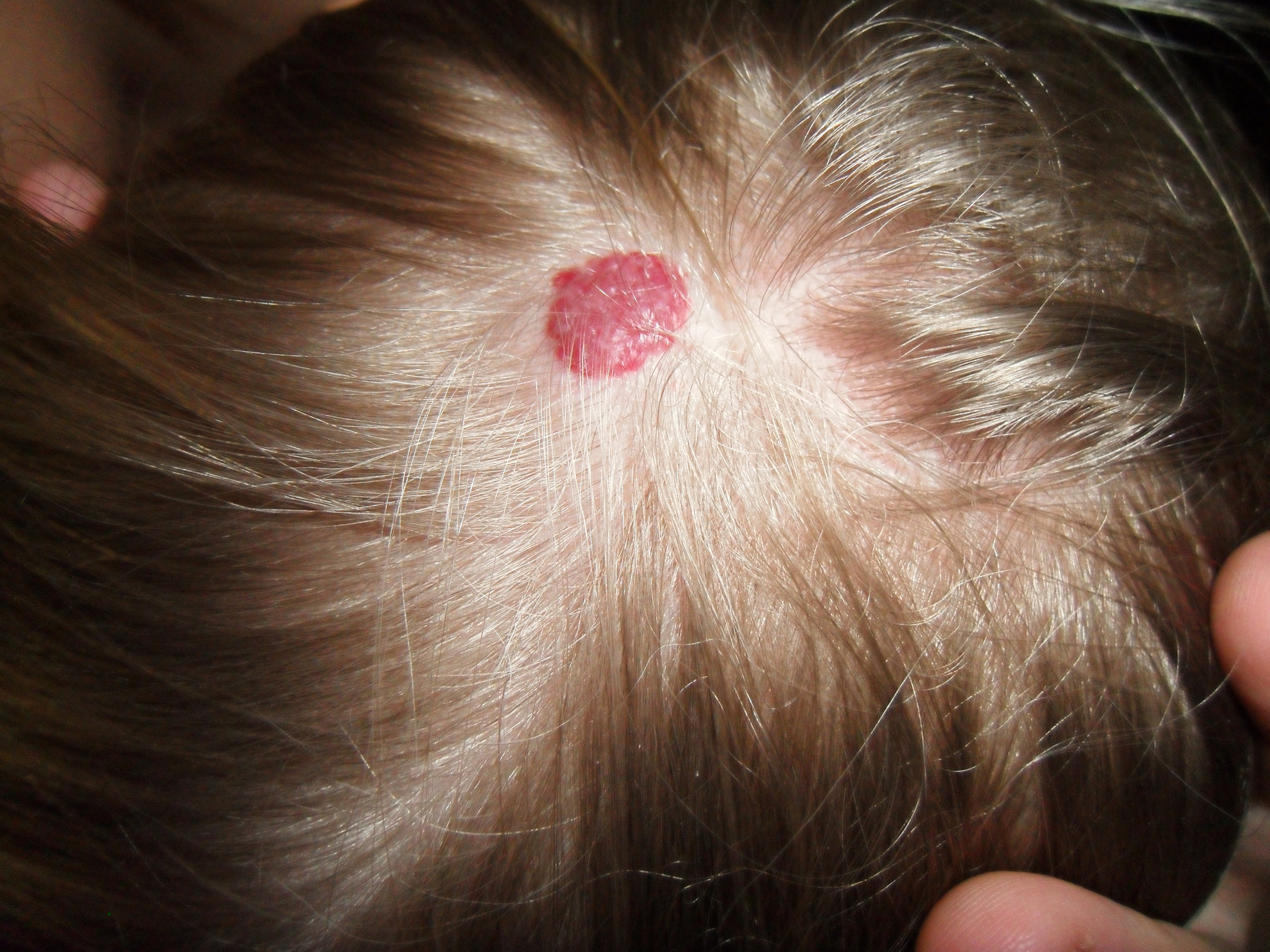
- A hemangioma, a benign type of vascular tumor
- Specialty: Oncology

A vascular tumor is a vascular anomaly where a tumor forms from cells that make blood or lymph vessels; a soft tissue growth that can be either benign or malignant. Examples of vascular tumors include hemangiomas, hemangioendotheliomas, Kaposi's sarcomas, angiosarcomas, and hemangioblastomas. An angioma refers to any type of benign vascular tumor.

Some vascular tumors can be associated with serious blood-clotting disorders, making correct diagnosis critical.

A vascular tumor may be described in terms of being highly vascularized, or poorly vascularized, referring to the degree of blood supply to the tumor.

== Classification ==
Vascular tumors make up one of the classifications of vascular anomalies. The other grouping is vascular malformations. Vascular tumors can be further subclassified as being benign, borderline or aggressive, and malignant. Vascular tumors are described as proliferative, and vascular malformations as nonproliferative.

== Types ==
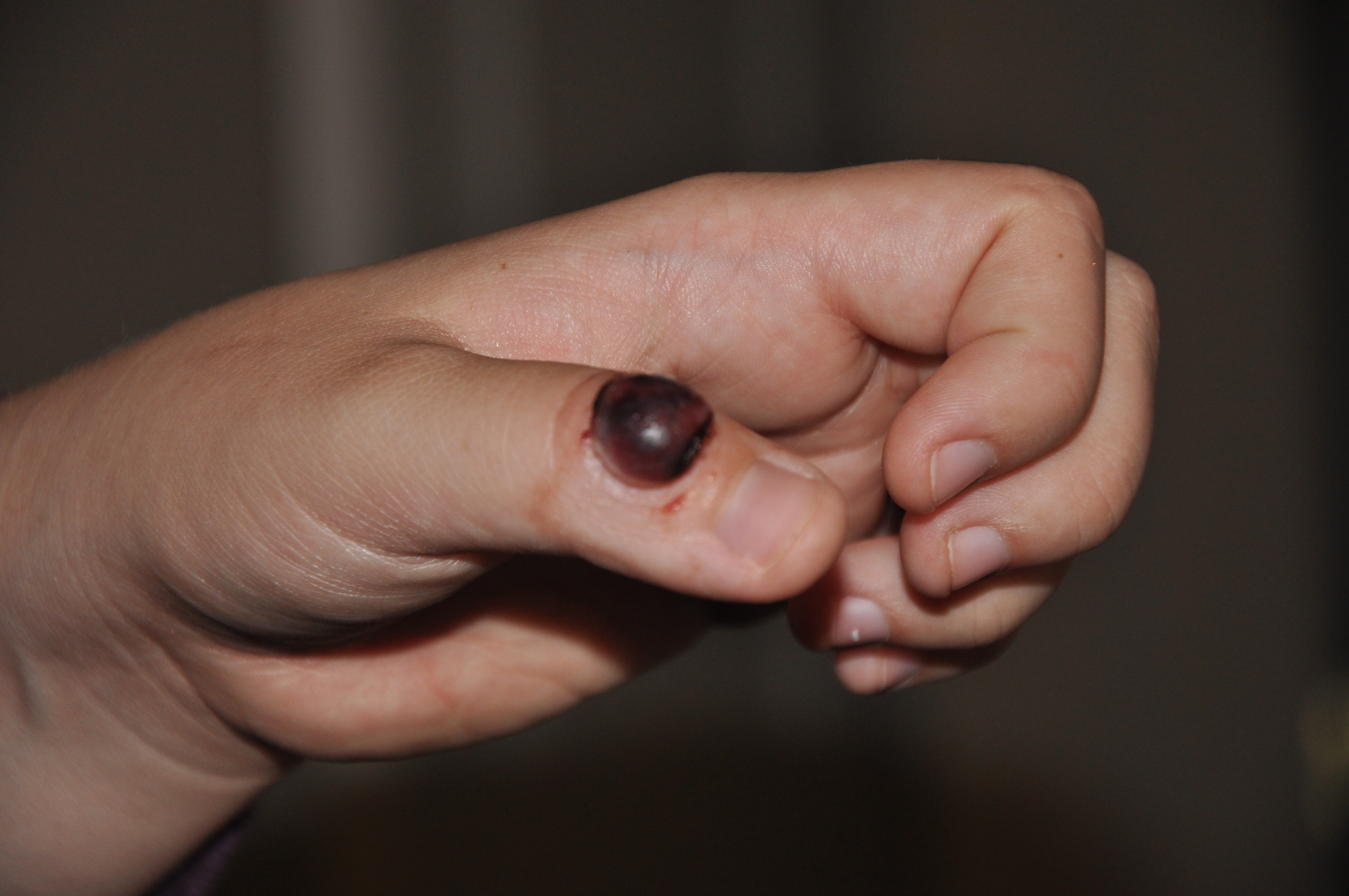
A pyogenic granuloma on a thumb.

A vascular tumor typically grows quickly by the proliferation of endothelial cells. Most are not birth defects.

=== Benign ===
The most common type of benign vascular tumors are hemangiomas, most commonly infantile hemangiomas, and less commonly congenital hemangiomas.

==== Infantile hemangioma ====
Infantile hemangiomas are the most common type of vascular tumor to affect babies, accounting for 90% of hemangiomas. They are characterised by the abnormal proliferation of endothelial cells and of deviant blood vessel formation or architecture. Hypoxic stress seems to be a major trigger for this. Infantile hemangiomas are easily diagnosed, and little if any aggressive treatment is needed. They are characterised by rapid growth in the first few months, followed by spontaneous regression in early childhood.

==== Congenital hemangioma ====
Congenital hemangiomas are present and fully formed at birth, and only account for 2% of the hemangiomas. They do not have the postnatal phase of proliferation common to infantile hemangiomas. There are two main variants of congenital hemangioma: non-involuting, and rapidly involuting (beginning in the first year of life). A third variant is also recognised as partially involuting. Congenital hemangiomas can also be distinguished from infantile hemangiomas in that neither variant of congenital hemangioma expresses the glucose transporter GLUT 1.

Some cases have been associated with a mild form of thrombocytopenia. Rare cases have been associated with heart failure.

==== Hemangioblastoma ====
Hemangioblastomas are vascular tumors of the central nervous system.

==== Pyogenic granuloma ====
A range of benign vascular tumors are described as reactive proliferative lesions that grow in response to a stimulus, such as trauma, or a local thrombosis. They can also form infrequently during pregnancy as a hormonal reaction affecting the gums.

The most common type of reactive proliferative tumors are pyogenic granulomas also known as lobular capillary hemangiomas, that are more often found in children and young adults. These granulomas are well defined growths of less than a centimetre across. They are bright red due to being highly vascularised, and bleed and ulcerate easily. Their colouring fades with age.

==== Tufted angioma ====
Tufted angiomas are hereditary hemangiomas found in infants from birth to five years of age, however they may occur in adults. They are found on the neck, shoulders, and trunk as rounded nodules. Tufted angiomas are usually poorly defined lesions of purple colouration. The tumors are of tufts of capillary-sized vessels in lobules that are scattered in the skin, and that sometimes reach into the subcutaneous tissue, and have lymph vessels on the periphery. Their growth is slow to begin with, and progresses to a stable size. They show a high rate of spontaneous regression, particularly in congenital and early-onset cases. They typically have a deep nodular component sometimes extending into the subcutaneous tissue, fascia, and muscle, and can sometimes be painful. Tufted angiomas are associated with arteriovenous malformations.

The origin of tufted angiomas is not clear but markers on the cells suggest a possible derivation from the endothelial cells of lymph vessels. They are also associated with the local secretion of growth factors that affect angiogenesis and promote the development of vascular lobules.

=== Borderline ===
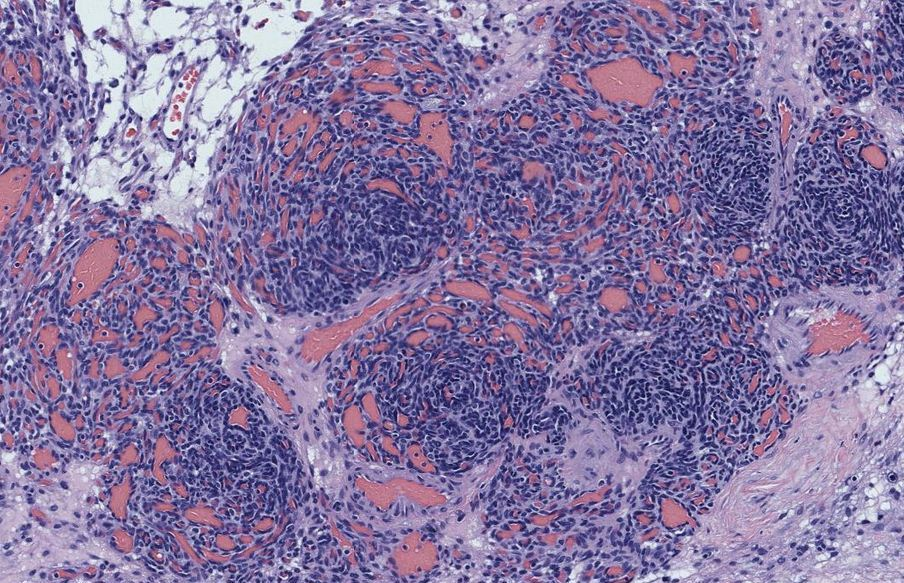
Kaposiform hemangioendothelioma

Kaposiform hemangioendotheliomas (KHEs) are borderline, locally destructive vascular tumors. They are named after their resemblance to the lesions of Kaposi's sarcoma. KHEs are described as locally destructive because they can infiltrate underlying muscle and fat. They are often seen to overlap with tufted angiomas (TAs) but TAs may be a milder, benign counterpart.

KHEs show as a red or purple expanding mass of soft tissue, found mostly in infants. Under the microscope KHE is characterised by nodules of tumor-like spindled endothelial cells. Unlike infantile hemangiomas, KHEs have a high mortality rate. Both KHEs and TAs are unique in that they carry the risk of the development of Kasabach–Merritt syndrome.

=== Malignant ===
Malignant vascular tumors are rare, and include angiosarcomas, and epithelioid hemangioendotheliomas. Other types are hemangiopericytomas, and lymphangiosarcomas.
