= Angioma =

Benign tumors derived from cells composing or surrounding blood or lymph vessels

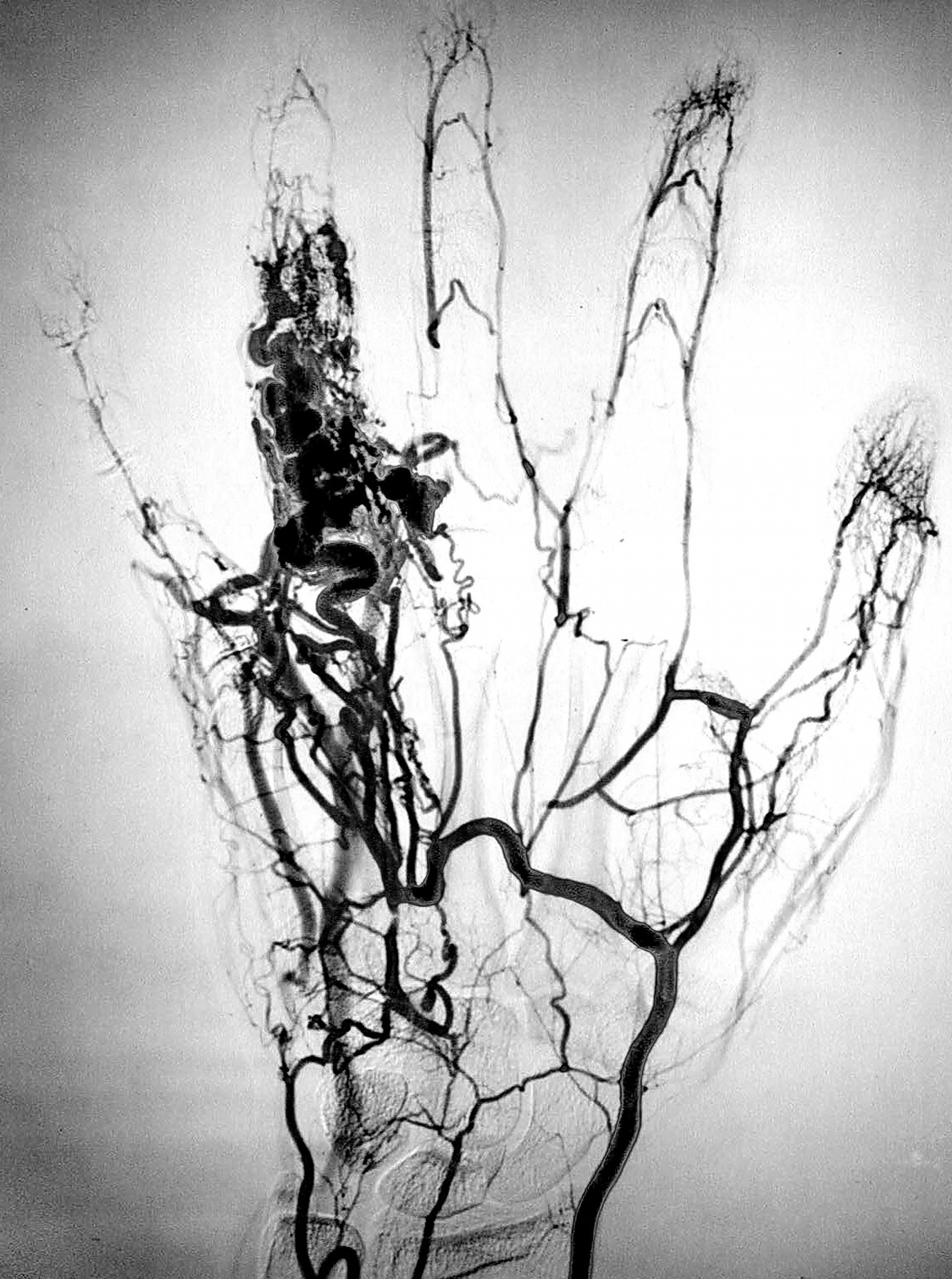
- Arteriography showing the blood vessels involved in an angioma of the ring finger
- Specialty: Dermatology

Angiomas are benign tumors derived from cells of the vascular or lymphatic vessel walls (endothelium) or derived from cells of the tissues surrounding these vessels.

Angiomas are a frequent occurrence as patients age, but they might be an indicator of systemic problems such as liver disease. They are not commonly associated with cancer.

== Signs and symptoms ==
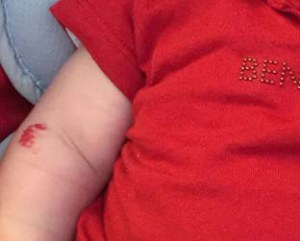
An infantile hemangioma, also called a strawberry angioma, on a child's arm

Angiomas usually appear at or near the surface of the skin anywhere on the body, and may be considered bothersome depending on their location. However, they may be present as symptoms of another more serious disorder, such as cirrhosis. When they are removed, it is generally for cosmetic reasons.

== Types ==
- Hemangiomas
  - Capillary: Cherry hemangioma, infantile hemangioma
  - Cavernous
  - Pyogenic granuloma
- Lymphangiomas
  - Capillary (simple)
  - Cavernous (cystic)
- Glomus tumor
- Vascular ectasias
  - Naevus flammeus
  - Telangiectasia – spider, hereditary hemorrhagic
- Reactive vascular proliferations
  - Bacillary angiomatosis

== See also ==
- Angiomatosis
- Angiomatosis retinae
- List of cutaneous conditions
- Vascular anomalies
