= Sharon Weiss =

American pathologist

Sharon W. Weiss
- Born: June 1945 (age 81); Lynn, Massachusetts
- Education: Johns Hopkins University School of Medicine
- Known for: Research in Soft Tissue Pathology and Surgical pathology.
- Awards: Maude Abbott Lecture and Award, Lifetime Achievement Award (United States and Canadian Academy of Pathology), Phi Beta Kappa, Alpha Omega Alpha, Wellesley Alumnae Achievement Award, Johns Hopkins Society of Scholars (distinguished alumna), A James French Professor of Diagnostic Pathology (University of Michigan)
- Scientific career
- Fields: Medicine & Pathology

Sharon Ann Whelan Weiss is an American pathologist who is best known for her contribution to the subspecialty of soft tissue pathology. She is the main author of Soft Tissue Tumors, one of the most widely used textbooks in the field of sarcoma and soft tissue pathology. She is also well known for her seminal descriptions of multiple soft tissue tumors, such as epithelioid hemangioendothelioma and pleomorphic hyalinizing angiectatic tumor of soft parts ("PHAT" which is categorized as a rare and locally aggressive neoplasm occurring in the lower extremities of a patient) among others. She has also mentored and trained other well-known soft tissue pathologists.

== Early life and education ==
Weiss was born in 1945 in Lynn, Massachusetts, the oldest of six children. Her father was an Army surgeon. She received her undergraduate education at Wellesley College in Wellesley, Massachusetts, where she graduated with a B.A. in 1966. Upon graduation she married fellow physician Bernard Weiss. She received her medical education at Johns Hopkins University School of Medicine (M.D., 1971) and residency training in Anatomic Pathology at Johns Hopkins Hospital (1972–1975) in Baltimore, Maryland. She was the first female to serve as Chief Resident of Pathology in the history of the hospital.

== Career ==
From 1976 to 1989 she worked as a soft tissue pathologist at the Armed Forces Institute of Pathology (AFIP) under the mentoring of Dr. Franz Enzinger, one of the fathers of the field of soft tissue pathology. In 1989 she moved to the University of Michigan in Ann Arbor, Michigan, where she served as the A. James French Professor of Pathology, Director of Anatomic Pathology, and Chief of Surgical Pathology. In 1998 she became Professor of Pathology and Laboratory Medicine at Emory University Hospital in Atlanta, Georgia. She is the director of the expert consultation service at Emory University Hospital, where she provides diagnostic second opinions on sarcomas and other soft tissue pathology cases. She is also the Associate Dean for Faculty Development, a position she has held since 2006.

== Professional involvement and honors ==
Weiss served as President of the United States and Canadian Academy of Pathology (1997–1998) and currently serves as a Trustee of the American Board of Pathology (2005 to present).

== Initial characterization of new soft tissue pathologic entities ==
Her contributions to the field have been described as "monumental". She was the first to describe/characterize the following soft tissue pathologic entities:

- Epithelioid hemangioendothelioma(1982)
- Kaposiform hemangioendothelioma(1993)
- Myxoid variant of malignant fibrous histiocytoma (myxofibrosarcoma)(1977)
- Neuroblastoma-like Neurilemoma (Schwannoma)
- Palisaded Myofibroblastoma (1989), described earlier that year by Saul Suster
- Paraganglioma-like dermal melanocytic tumor
- Pleomorphic hyalinizing angiectatic tumor of soft parts (so-called "PHAT")(1996)
- Sclerosing Rhabdomyosarcoma (2002)
- Spindle cell hemangioma (formerly spindle cell hemangioendothelioma)(1986)

== See also ==
- List of pathologists
