= Katharine Krom Merritt =

- Born: January 9, 1886; Stamford, Connecticut
- Died: August 5, 1986 (aged 100); Stamford, Connecticut
- Education: Vassar College; Johns Hopkins Medical School
- Known for: Kasabach–Merritt syndrome
- Scientific career
- Fields: Medicine

Katharine Krom Merritt (9 January 1886 in Stamford, Connecticut – 5 August 1986 in Stamford, Connecticut) was an American physician specializing in pediatrics. The Kasabach–Merritt syndrome is named after Haig Kasabach and her. She was also a member of the International Society for the History of Medicine (ISHM).
