= Infantile hemangioma =

Raised red skin lesion that affects infants caused by benign vascular tumor

- Other names: Infantile haemangioma, hemangioma, capillary hemangioma, capillary angioma, strawberry haemangioma, strawberry mark
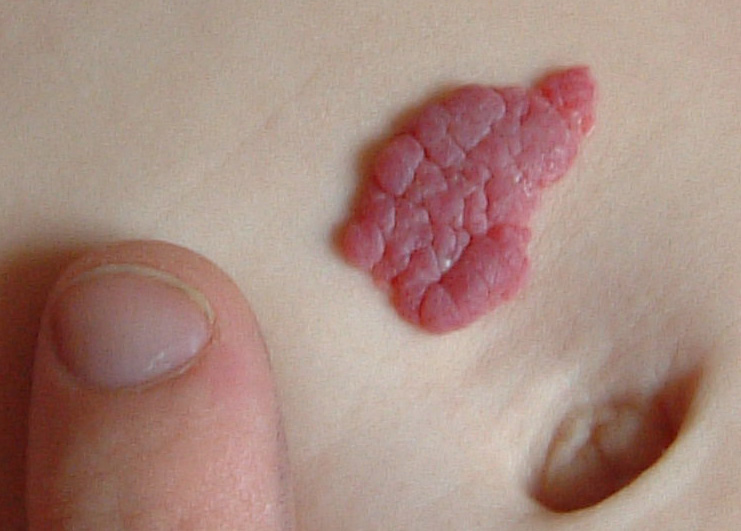
- A small hemangioma of infancy
- Specialty: Dermatology, gastroenterology, Oral and Maxillofacial Surgery
- Symptoms: Raised red or blue lesion
- Complications: Pain, bleeding, ulcer formation, heart failure, disfigurement
- Usual onset: First 4 weeks of life
- Types: Superficial, deep, mixed
- Risk factors: Females, whites, premature birth, low birth weight babies
- Diagnostic method: Based on symptoms and appearance
- Differential diagnosis: Congenital hemangioma, pyogenic granuloma, kaposiform hemangioendothelioma, tufted angioma, venous malformation, other vascular anomaly
- Treatment: Close observation, medication
- Medication: Propranolol, Timolol, steroids
- Frequency: Up to 5%

An infantile hemangioma (IH), sometimes called a strawberry mark due to appearance, is a type of benign vascular tumor or anomaly that affects babies. Other names include capillary hemangioma, "strawberry hemangioma", strawberry birthmark and strawberry nevus. and formerly known as a cavernous hemangioma. They appear as a red or blue raised lesion on the skin. Typically, they begin during the first four weeks of life, growing until about five months of life, and then shrinking in size and disappearing over the next few years. Often skin changes remain after they shrink. Complications may include pain, bleeding, ulcer formation, disfigurement, or heart failure. It is the most common tumor of orbit and periorbital areas in childhood. It may occur in the skin, subcutaneous tissues and mucous membranes of oral cavities and lips as well as in extracutaneous locations including the liver and gastrointestinal tract.

The underlying reason for their occurrence is not clear. In about 10% of cases they appear to run in families. A few cases are associated with other abnormalities such as PHACE syndrome. Diagnosis is generally based on the symptoms and appearance. Occasionally medical imaging can assist in the diagnosis.

In most cases no treatment is needed, other than close observation. Hemangiomas may grow rapidly, before stopping and slowly fading, with maximum improvement typically occurring by the age of 3 1/2 years. While this birthmark may be alarming in appearance, physicians generally counsel that it be left to disappear on its own, unless it is in the way of vision or blocking the nostrils. Certain cases, however, may result in problems and the use of medication such as propranolol or steroids are recommended. Occasionally surgery or laser treatment may be used.

It is one of the most common benign tumors in babies, occurring in about 5-10% of all births. They occur more frequently in females, whites, prematurely born, and low birth weight babies. They can occur anywhere on the body, though 83% occur on the head or neck area. The word "hemangioma" comes from the Greek haima (αἷμα) meaning "blood"; angeion (ἀγγεῖον) meaning "vessel"; and -oma (-ωμα) meaning "tumor".

== Signs and symptoms ==
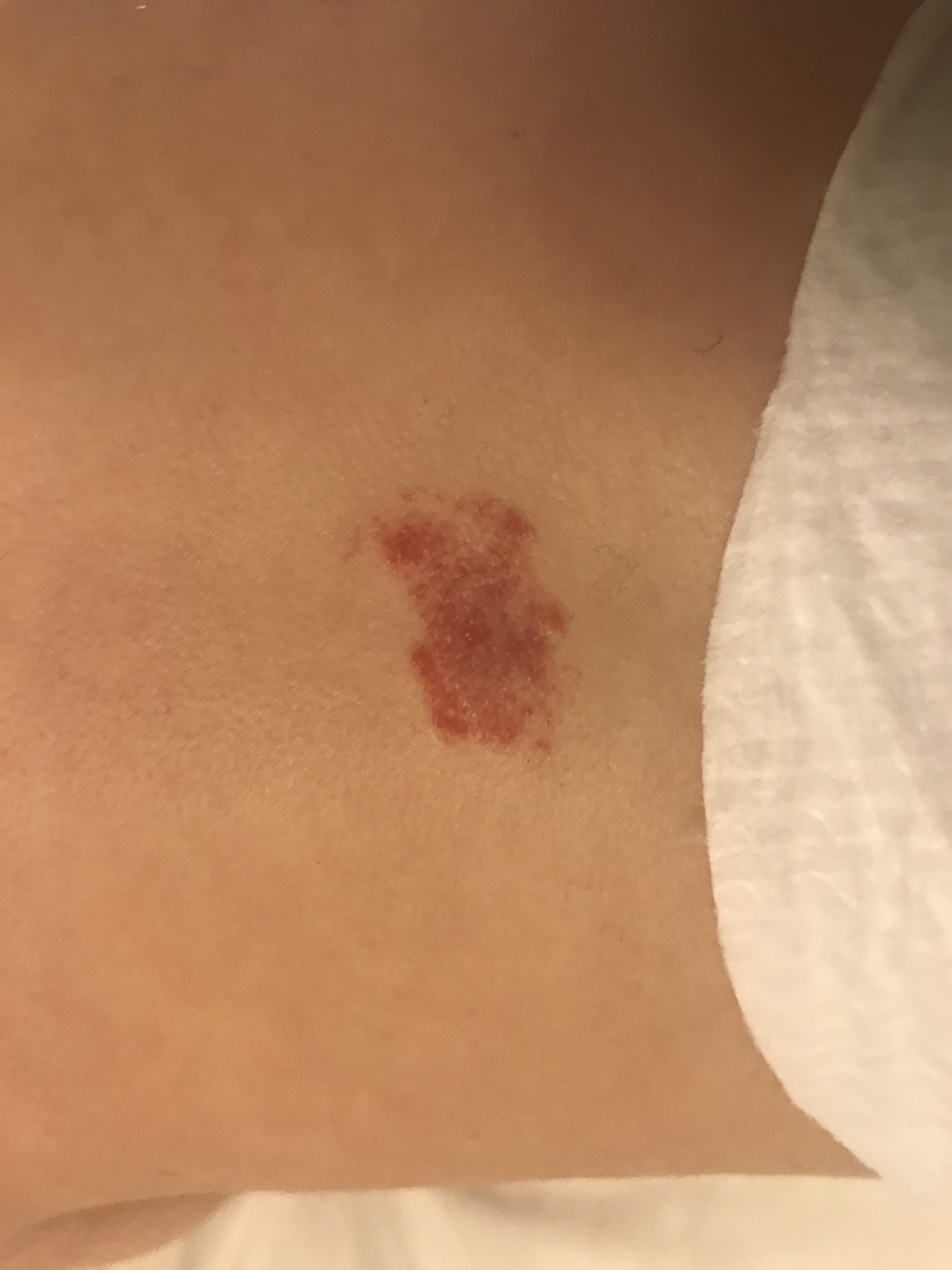
A flat hemangioma in a baby

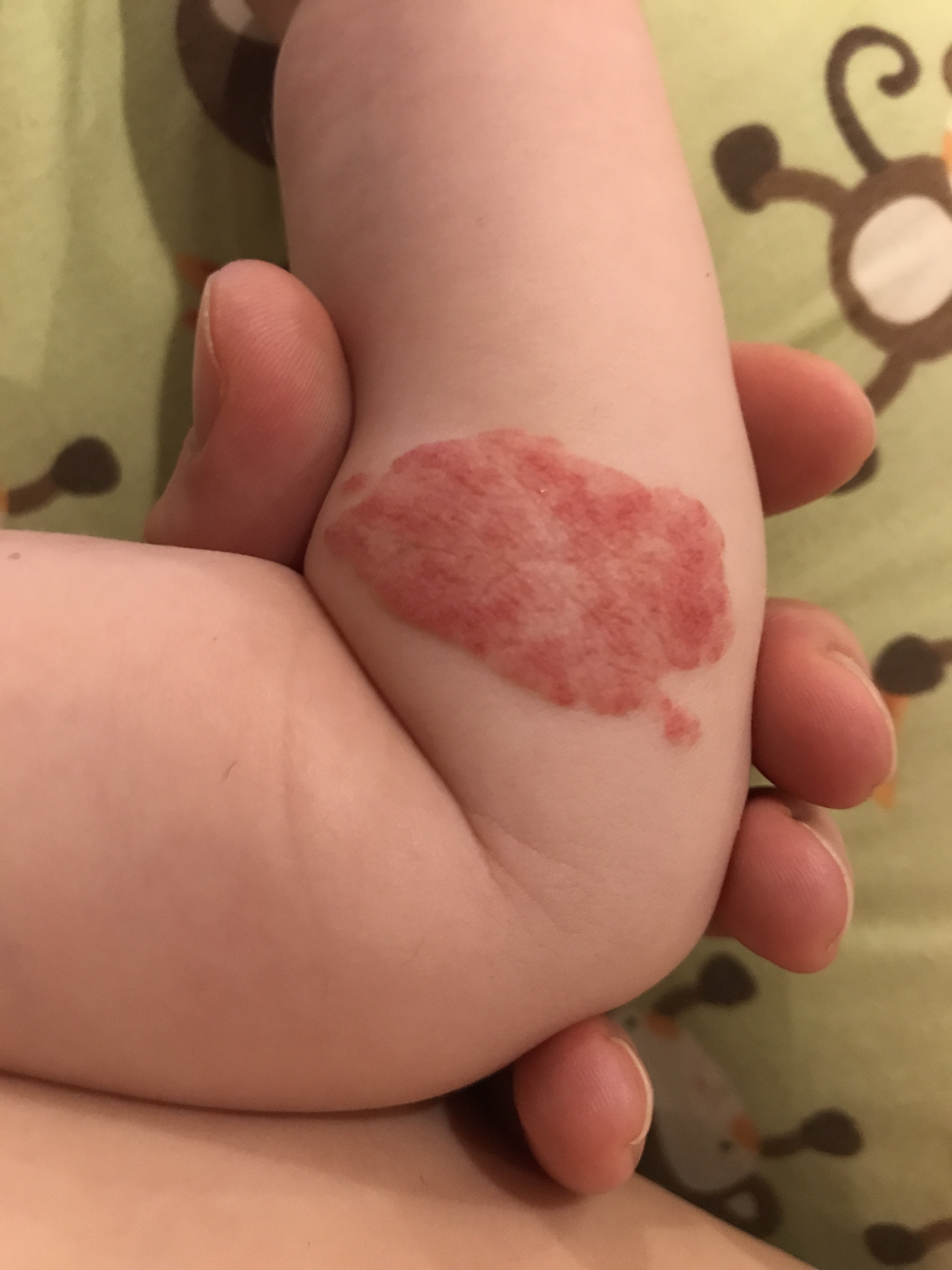
A resolving hemangioma

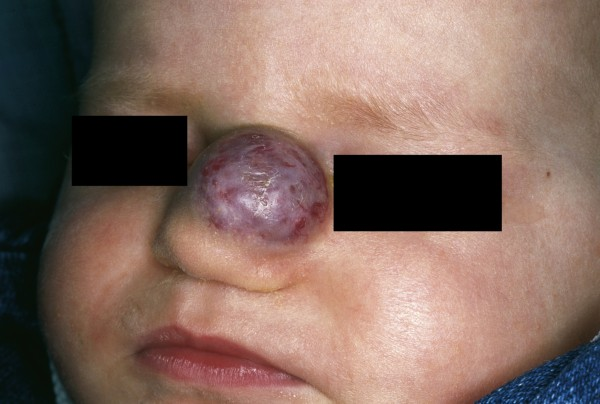
Infantile hemangioma, well-circumscribed red, violet, exophytic vascular tumor on the nose of a one-year-old child

Infantile hemangiomas typically develop in the first few weeks or months of life. They are more common in Caucasians, in premature children whose birth weight is less than 3 pounds (1.4 kg), in females, and in twin births. Early lesions may resemble a red scratch or patch, a white patch, or a bruise. The majority occur on the head and neck, but they can occur almost anywhere. The appearance and color of the IH depend on its location and depth within the level of the skin.

Superficial IHs are situated higher in the skin and have a bright red, erythematous to reddish-purple appearance. Superficial lesions can be flat and telangiectatic, composed of a macule or patch of small, varied branching, capillary blood vessels. They can also be raised and elevated from the skin, forming papules and confluent bright-red plaques like raised islands. Infantile hemangiomas have historically been referred to as "strawberry marks" or "strawberry hemangiomas" in the past, as raised superficial hemangiomas can look like the side of a strawberry without seeds, and this remains a common lay term.

Superficial IHs in certain locations, such as the posterior scalp, neck folds, and groin/perianal areas, are at potential risk of ulceration. Ulcerated hemangiomas can present as black crusted papules or plaques, or painful erosions or ulcers. Ulcerations are prone to secondary bacterial infections, which can present with yellow crusting, drainage, pain, or odor. Ulcerations are also at risk for bleeding, particularly deep lesions or in areas of friction. Multiple superficial hemangiomas, more than five, can be associated with extracutaneous hemangiomas, the most common being a liver (hepatic) hemangioma, and these infants warrant ultrasound examination.

Deep IHs present as poorly defined, bluish macules that can proliferate into papules, nodules, or larger tumors. Proliferating lesions are often compressible, but fairly firm. Many deep hemangiomas may have a few superficial capillaries visible evident over the primary deep component or surrounding venous prominence. Deep hemangiomas have a tendency to develop a little later than superficial hemangiomas, and may have longer and later proliferative phases, as well. Deep hemangiomas rarely ulcerate, but can cause issues depending on their location, size, and growth. Deep hemangiomas near sensitive structures can cause compression of softer surrounding structures during the proliferative phase, such as the external ear canal and the eyelid. Mixed hemangiomas are simply a combination of superficial and deep hemangiomas, and may not be evident for several months. Patients may have any combination of superficial, deep, or mixed IHs.

IHs are often classified as focal/localized, segmental, or indeterminate. Focal IHs appear localized to a specific location and appear to arise from a solitary spot. Segmental hemangiomas are larger, and appear to encompass a region of the body. Larger or segmental hemangiomas that span a large area can sometimes have underlying anomalies that may require investigation, especially when located on the face, sacrum, or pelvis.

Unless ulceration occurs, an IH does not tend to bleed and is not painful. Discomfort may arise if it is bulky and blocks a vital orifice.

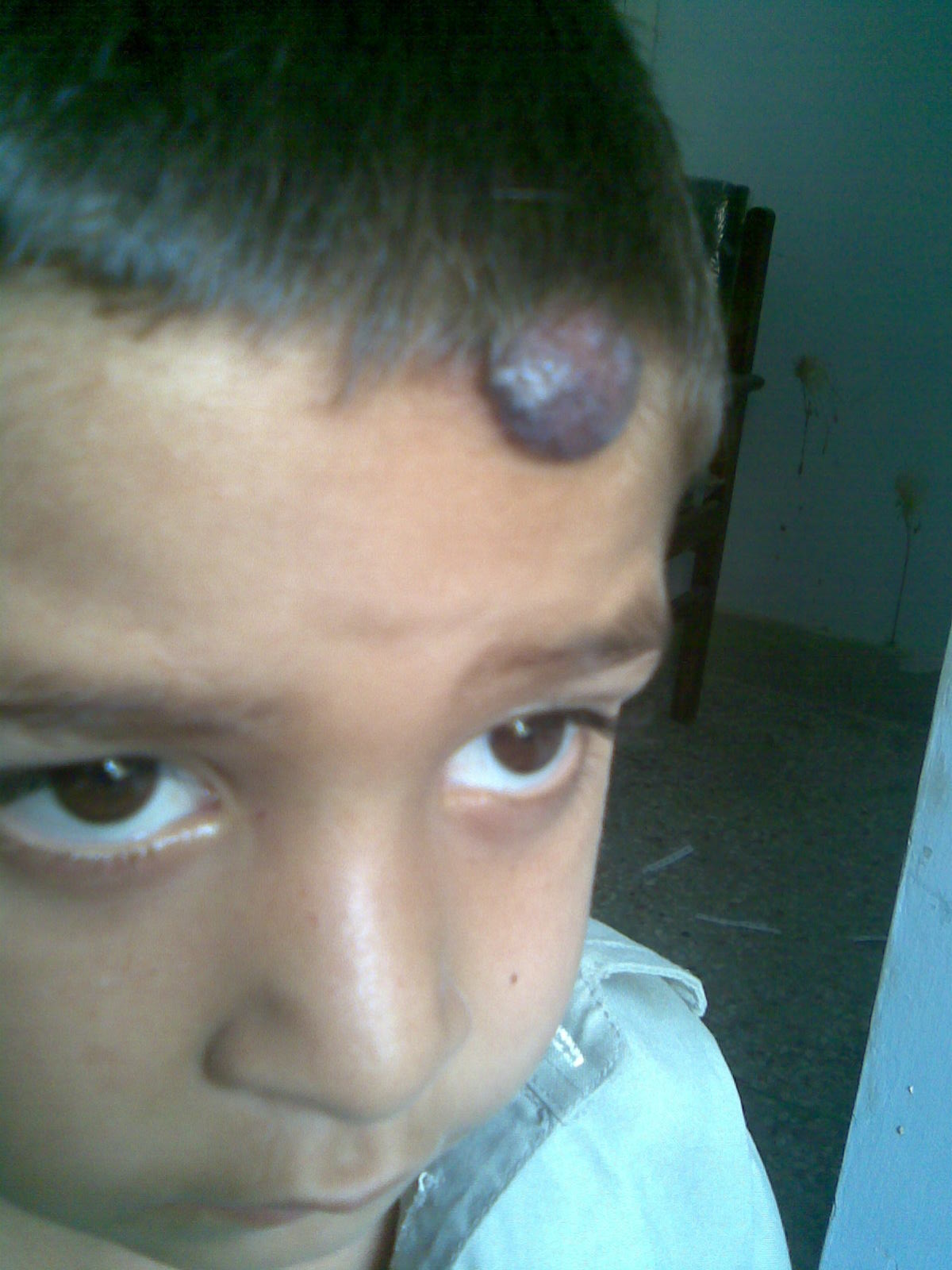
Hemangioma on forehead showing signs of early regression

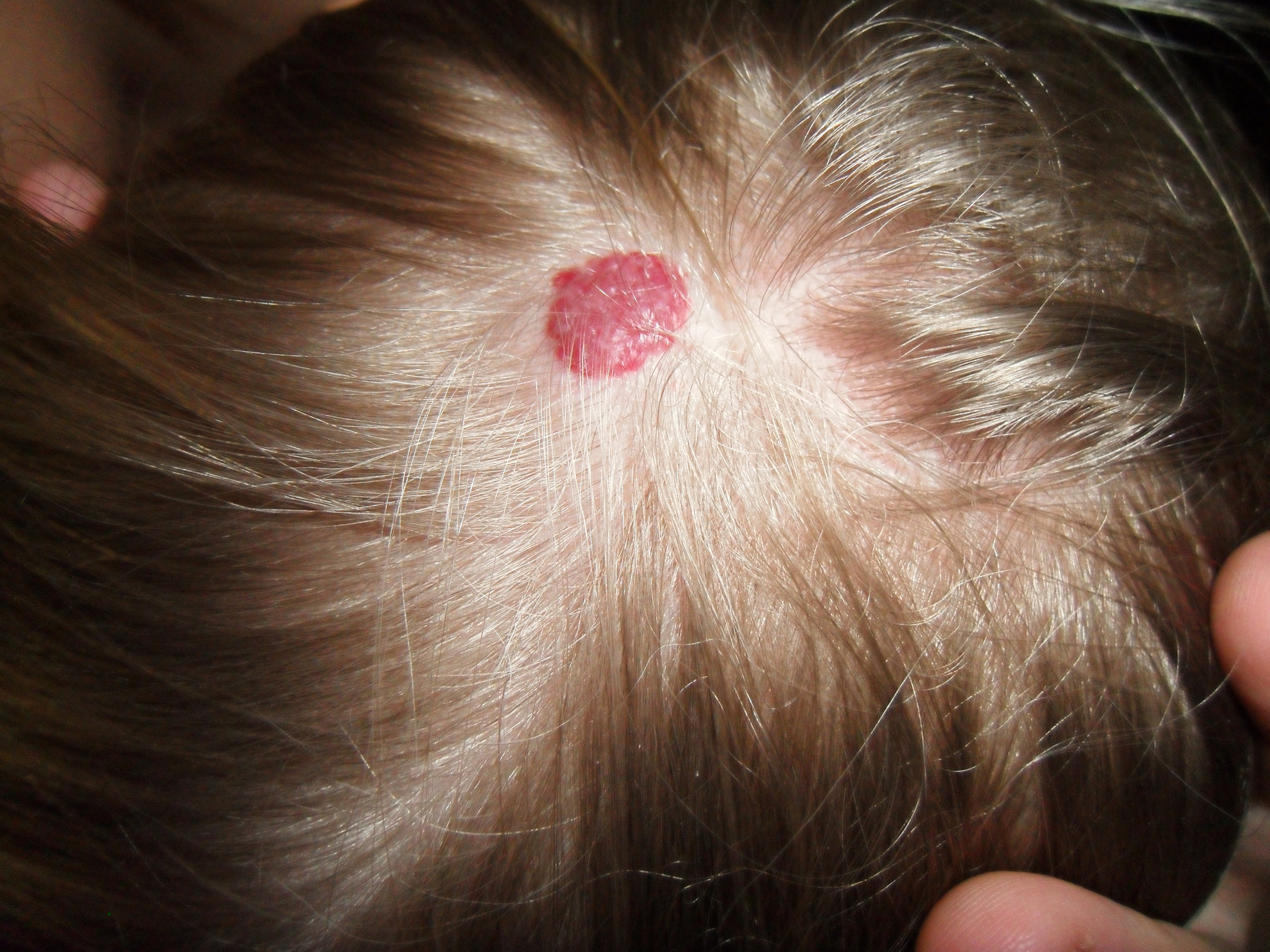
Hemangioma on the scalp of a 2-year-old child, in the "rest stage"

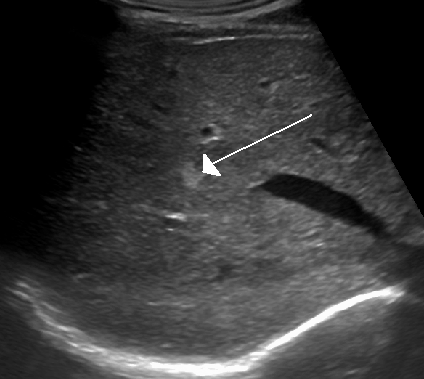
Hemangioma of the liver as seen on ultrasound

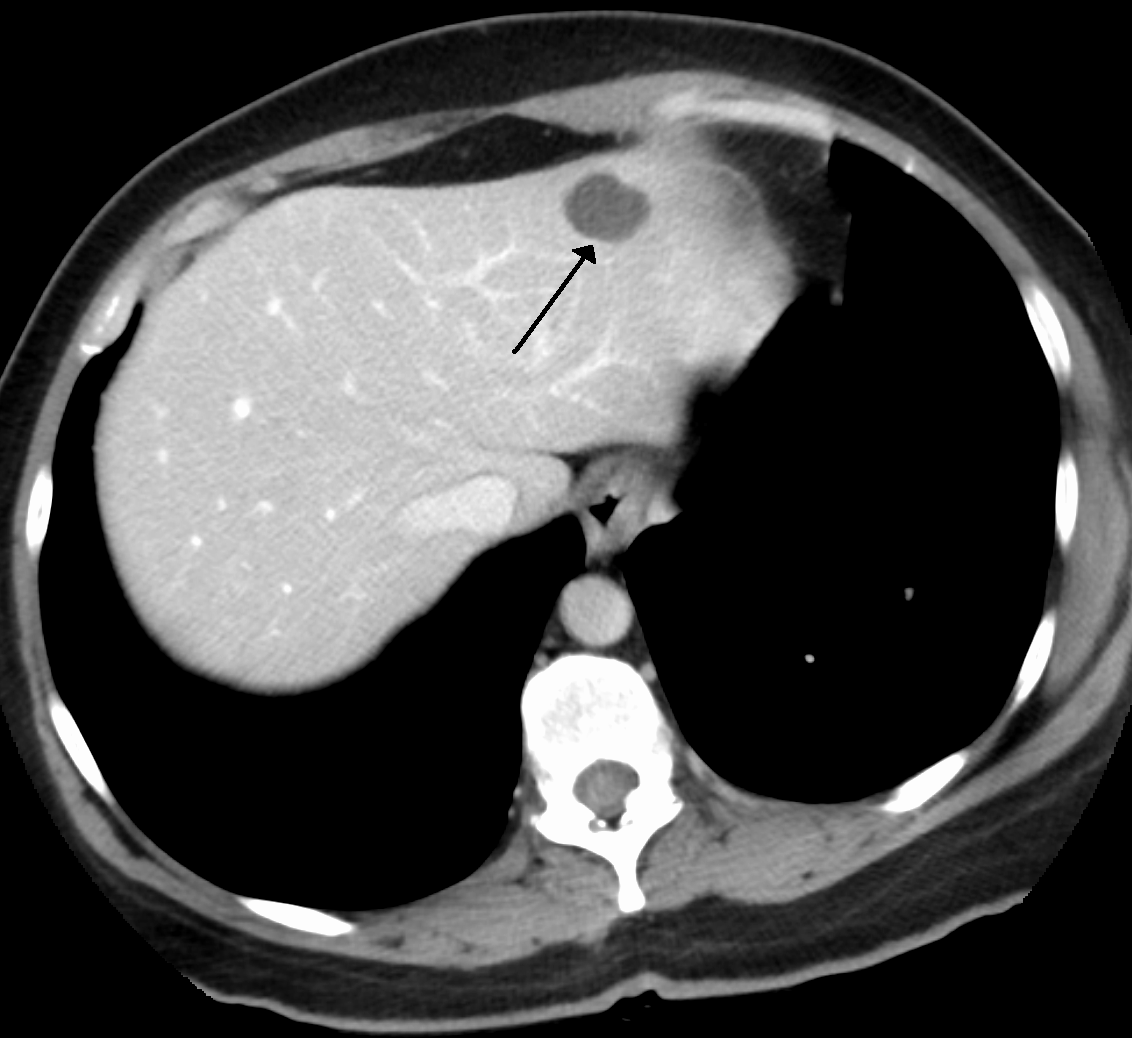
A liver hemangioma as seen on CT

=== Complications ===
Almost no IHs are associated with complications. They may break down on the surface, called ulceration, which can be painful and problematic. If the ulceration is deep, significant discomfort, bleeding and infection may occur. If a hemangioma develops in the larynx, breathing can be compromised. If located near the eye, a growing hemangioma may cause an occlusion or deviation of the eye that can lead to amblyopia. Very rarely, extremely large hemangiomas can cause high-output heart failure due to the amount of blood that must be pumped to excess blood vessels. Lesions adjacent to bone may cause erosion of the bone.

The most frequent complaints about IHs stem from psychosocial complications. The condition can affect a person's appearance and provoke attention and malicious reactions from others. Particular problems occur if the lip or nose is involved, as distortions can be difficult to treat surgically. The potential for psychological injury develops from school age onward. Considering treatment before school begins is, therefore, important if adequate spontaneous improvement has not occurred. Large IHs can leave visible skin changes secondary to severe stretching that results in altered surface texture.

Large segmental hemangiomas of the head and neck can be associated with a disorder called PHACES syndrome. Large segmental hemangiomas over the lumbar spine can be associated with dysraphism, renal, and urogenital problems in association with a disorder called LUMBAR syndrome. Multiple cutaneous hemangiomas in infants may be an indicator for liver hemangiomas. Screening for liver involvement is often recommended in infants with five or more skin hemangiomas.

== Causes ==
The cause of hemangioma is currently unknown, but several studies have suggested the importance of estrogen signaling in proliferation. Localized soft-tissue hypoxia coupled with increased circulating estrogen after birth may be the stimulus. Also, a hypothesis was presented by researchers that maternal placenta embolizes to the fetal dermis during gestation, resulting in hemangiomagenesis. However, another group of researchers conducted genetic analyses of single-nucleotide polymorphism in hemangioma tissue compared to the mother's DNA which contradicted this hypothesis. Other studies have revealed the role of increased angiogenesis and vasculogenesis in the etiology of hemangiomas.

== Diagnosis ==
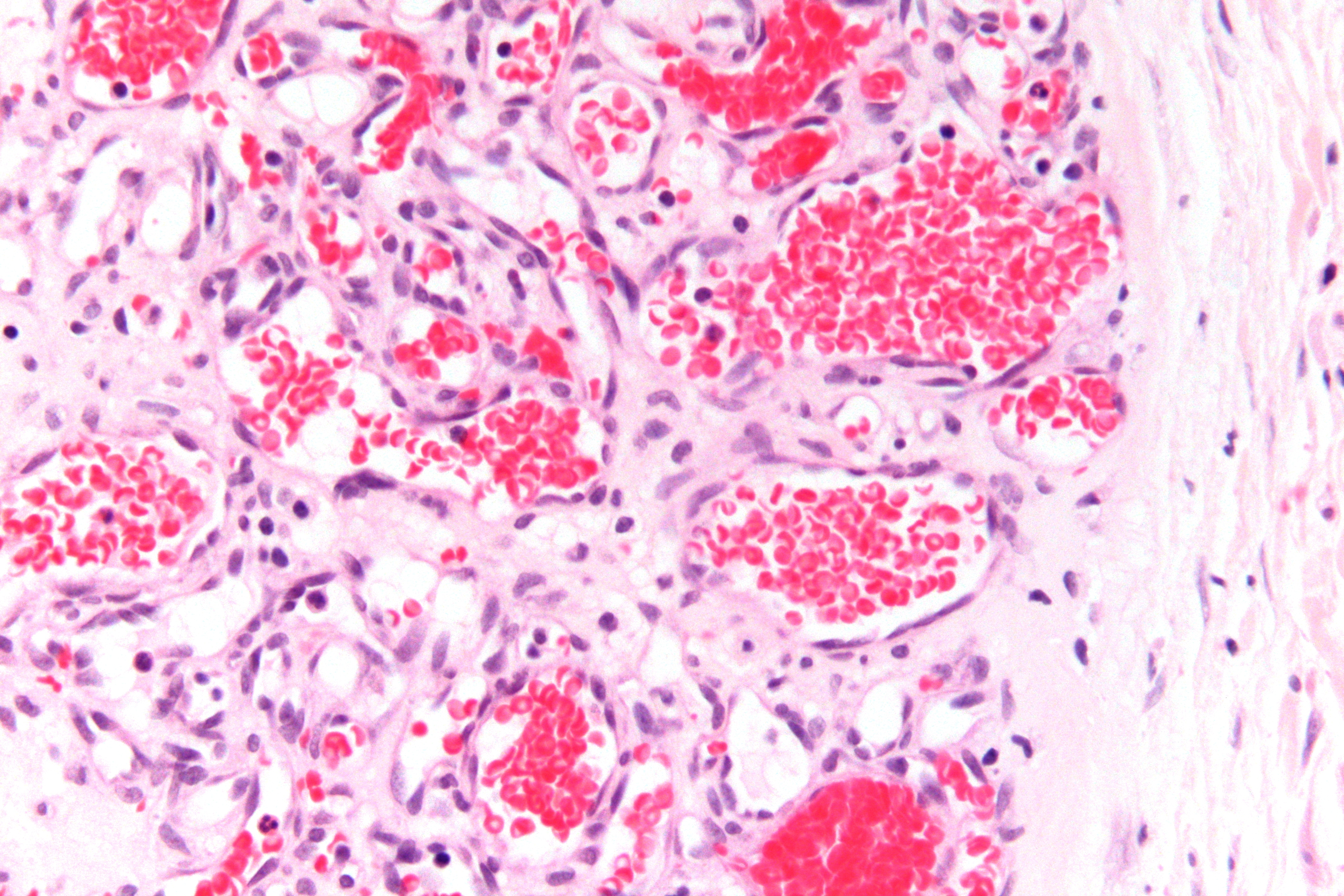
Capillary hemangioma

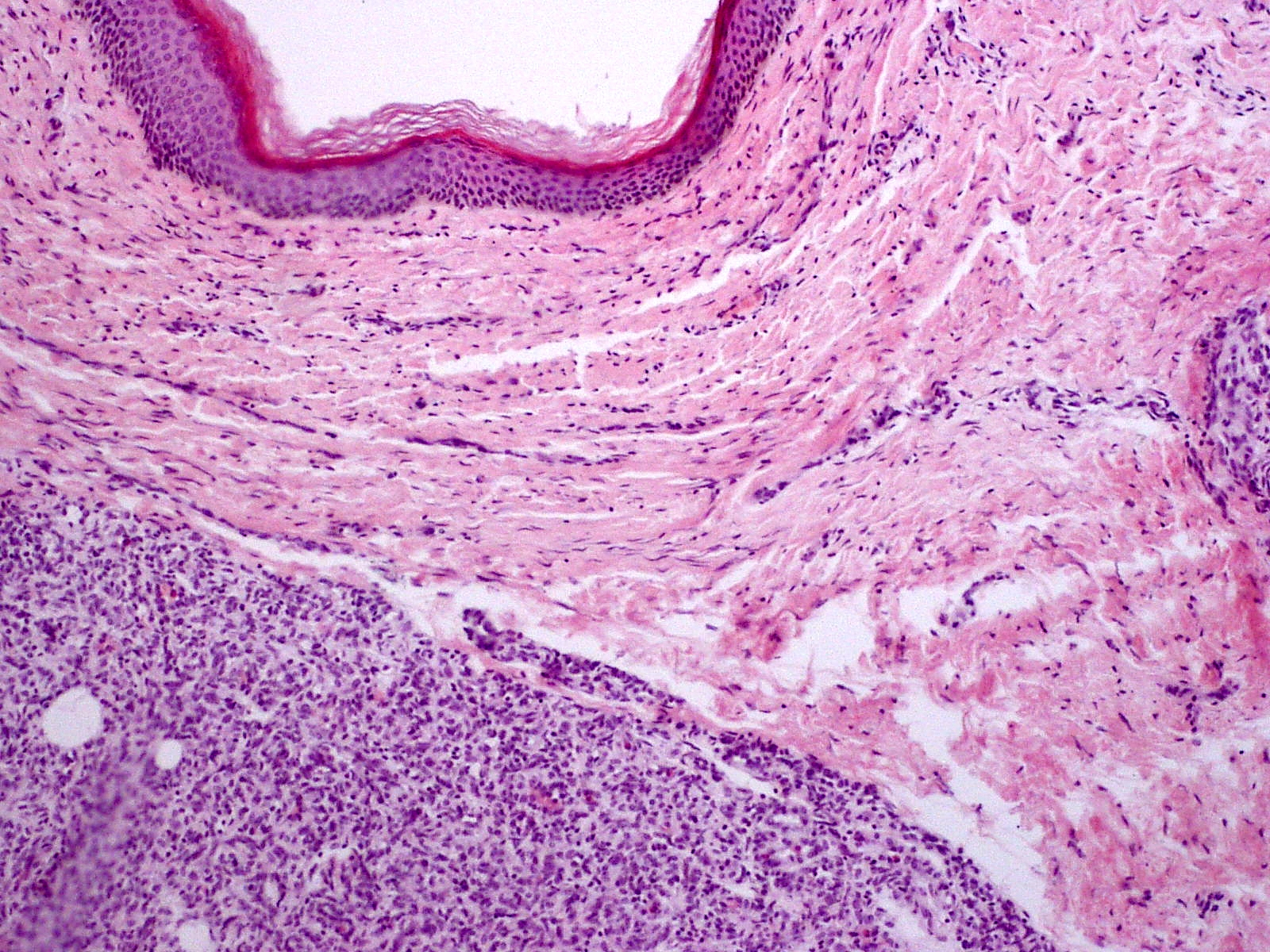
Strawberry naevus, H&E stain

The majority of IHs can be diagnosed by history and physical examination. In rare cases, imaging (ultrasound with Doppler, magnetic resonance imaging), and/or cytology or histopathology are needed to confirm the diagnosis. IHs are usually absent at birth or a small area of pallor, telangiectasias, or duskiness may be seen. A fully formed mass at birth usually indicates a different diagnosis. Superficial hemangiomas in the upper dermis have a bright-red strawberry color, whereas those in the deep dermis and subcutis, deep hemangiomas, may appear blue and be firm or rubbery on palpation. Mixed hemangiomas can have both features. A minimally proliferative IH is an uncommon type that presents with fine macular telangiectasias with an occasional bright-red, papular, proliferative component. Minimally proliferative IHs are more common in the lower body.

A precise history of the growth characteristics of the IH can be very helpful in making the diagnosis. In the first 4 to 8 weeks of life, IHs grow rapidly with primarily volumetric rather than radial growth. This is usually followed by a period of slower growth that can last 6–9 months, with 80% of the growth completed by 3 months. Finally, IHs involute over a period of years. The exceptions to these growth characteristics include minimally proliferative His, which do not substantially proliferate and large, deep IHs in which noticeable growth starts later and lasts longer. If the diagnosis is not clear based on physical examination and growth history (most often in deep hemangiomas with little cutaneous involvement), then either imaging or histopathology can help confirm the diagnosis. On Doppler ultrasound, an IH in the proliferative phase appears as a high-flow, soft-tissue mass usually without direct arteriovenous shunting. On MRI, IHs show a well-circumscribed lesion with intermediate and increased signal intensity on T1- and T2-weighted sequences, respectively, and strong enhancement after gadolinium injections, with fast-flow vessels. Tissue for diagnosis can be obtained via fine-needle aspiration, skin biopsy, or excisional biopsy. Under the microscope, IHs are unencapsulated aggregates of closely packed, thin-walled capillaries, usually with endothelial lining. Blood-filled vessels are separated by scant connective tissue. Their lumina may be thrombosed and organized. Hemosiderin pigment deposition due to vessel rupture may be observed. The GLUT-1 histochemical marker can be helpful in distinguishing IHs from other items on the differential diagnosis, such as vascular malformations.

=== Liver ===
Infantile hemangiomas in the liver are found in 16% of all liver hemangiomas. Its sizes are usually less than 1 to 2 cm in diameter. It may show a "flash-filling" phenomenon in which there is a fast enhancement of the contrast material in the lesion instead of slow, centripetal, nodular filling of the lesions in usual hemangiomas. On CT and MRI, it shows rapid filling during arterial phase, with contrast retention in venous and delayed phases.

== Treatment ==
Most IHs disappear without treatment, leaving minimal to no visible marks. This may take many years, however, and a proportion of lesions may require some form of therapy. Multidisciplinary clinical practice guidelines for the management of infantile hemangiomas were recently published. Indications for treatment include functional impairment (i.e. visual or feeding compromise), bleeding, potentially life-threatening complications (airway, cardiac, or hepatic disease), and risk of long-term or permanent disfigurement. Large IHs can leave visible skin changes secondary to significant stretching of the skin or alteration of surface texture. When they interfere with vision, breathing, or threaten significant disfigurement (most notably facial lesions, and in particular, nose and lips), they are usually treated. Medical therapies are most effective when used during the period of most significant hemangioma growth, which corresponds to the first 5 months of life. Ulcerated hemangiomas, a subset of lesions requiring therapy, are usually treated by addressing wound care, pain, and hemangioma growth.

=== Medication ===
Treatment options for IHs include medical therapies (systemic, intralesional, and topical), surgery, and laser therapy. Prior to 2008, the mainstay of therapy for problematic hemangiomas was oral corticosteroids, which are effective and remain an option for patients in whom beta-blocker therapy is contraindicated or poorly tolerated. Following the serendipitous observation that propranolol, a nonselective beta blocker, is well tolerated and effective for treatment of hemangiomas, the agent was studied in a large, randomized, controlled trial and was approved by the U.S. Food and Drug Administration for this indication in 2014. Oral propranolol is more effective than placebo, observation without intervention, or oral corticosteroids. Propranolol has subsequently become the first-line systemic medical therapy for treatment of these lesions.

Since that time, topical timolol maleate in addition to oral propranalol has become a common therapy for infantile hemangiomas. According to a 2018 Cochrane review, both of these therapies have demonstrated beneficial effects in terms of clearance of hemangiomas without an increase in harms. In addition, no difference was detected between these two agents and their ability to reduce hemangioma size; however, whether a difference in safety exists is not clear. All of these results were based on moderate- to low-quality evidence, thus further randomized, controlled trials with large populations of children are needed to further evaluate these therapies. This review concluded that for now, no evidence challenges oral propranalol as the standard systemic therapy for treatment of these lesions.

Other systemic therapies which may be effective for IH treatment include vincristine, interferon, and other agents with antiangiogenic properties. Vincristine, which requires central venous access for administration, is traditionally used as a chemotherapy agent, but has been demonstrated to have efficacy against hemangiomas and other childhood vascular tumors, such as kaposiform hemangioendothelioma and tufted angioma. Interferon-alpha 2a and 2b, given by subcutaneous injection, has shown efficacy against hemangiomas, but may result in spastic diplegia in up to 20% of treated children. These agents are rarely used now in the era of beta-blocker therapy.

Intralesional corticosteroid (usually triamcinolone) injection has been used for small, localized hemangiomas, where it has been demonstrated to be relatively safe and effective. Injection of upper eyelid hemangiomas is controversial, given the reported risk of retinal embolization, possibly related to high injection pressures. Topical timolol maleate, a nonselective beta blocker available in a gel-forming solution approved for the treatment of glaucoma, has been increasingly recognized as a safe and effective off-label alternative for treatment of small hemangiomas. It is generally applied two to three times daily.

=== Surgery ===
Surgical excision of hemangiomas is rarely indicated, and limited to lesions which fail medical therapy (or when it is contraindicated), which are anatomically distributed in a location which is amenable to resection, and in which resection would likely be necessary and the scar will be similar regardless of timing of the surgery. Surgery may also be useful for removal of residual fibrofatty tissue (following hemangioma involution) and reconstruction of damaged structures.

=== Laser ===
Laser therapy, most often the pulsed dye laser (PDL), plays a limited role in hemangioma management. PDL is most often used for treatment of ulcerated hemangiomas, often in conjunction with topical therapies and wound care, and may speed healing and diminish pain. Laser therapy may also be useful for early superficial IHs (although rapidly proliferating lesions may be more prone to ulceration following PDL treatment), and for the treatment of cutaneous telangiectasias which persist following involution.

== Prognosis ==
In the involution phase, an IH finally begins to diminish in size. While IHs were previously thought to improve by about 10% each year, newer evidence suggests that maximal improvement and involution is typically reached by 3.5 years of age. Most IHs resolve by age 10, but in some patients, the hemangioma does not completely resolve. Residual redness may be noted and can be improved with laser therapy, most commonly PDL. Ablative fractional resurfacing may be considered for textural skin changes. Hemangiomas, especially those that have gotten very large during the growth phase, may leave behind stretched skin or fibrofatty tissue that may be disfiguring or require future surgical correction. Areas of prior ulceration may leave behind permanent scarring.

Additional long-term sequelae stem from the identification of extracutaneous manifestations in association with the IH. For example, a patient with a large facial hemangioma who is found to meet criteria for PHACE syndrome will require potentially ongoing neurologic, cardiac, and/or ophthalmologic monitoring. In cases of IHs that compromise of vital structures, symptoms may improve with involution of the hemangioma. For example, respiratory distress would improve with involution of a space-occupying IH involving the airway and high-output heart failure may lessen with involution of a hepatic hemangioma and ultimately treatment may be tapered or discontinued. In other cases, such as an untreated eyelid hemangioma, resultant amblyopia does not improve with involution of the cutaneous lesion. For these reasons, infants with infantile hemangiomas should be evaluated by an appropriate clinician during the early proliferative phase so that risk monitoring and treatment be individualized and outcomes can be optimized.

== Terminology ==
The terminology used to define, describe, and categorize vascular tumors and malformations has changed over time. The term hemangioma was originally used to describe any vascular tumor-like structure, whether it was present at or around birth or appeared later in life. In 1982, Mulliken and Glowacki proposed a new classification system for vascular anomalies which has been widely accepted and adopted by the International Society for the Study of Vascular Anomalies. This classification system was recently updated in 2015. The classification of vascular anomalies is now based upon cellular features, natural history, and clinical behavior of the lesion. Vascular anomalies are divided into vascular tumors/neoplasms which include infantile hemangiomas, and vascular malformations that include entities with enlarged or abnormal vessels such as capillary malformations (port wine stains), venous malformations, and lymphatic malformations. In 2000, GLUT-1, a specific immunohistochemical marker, was found to be positive in IHs and negative in other vascular tumors or malformations. This marker has revolutionized the ability to distinguish between infantile hemangioma and other vascular anomalies.

== See also ==
- Hemangioma
- List of cutaneous conditions
