= Hemangioendothelioma =

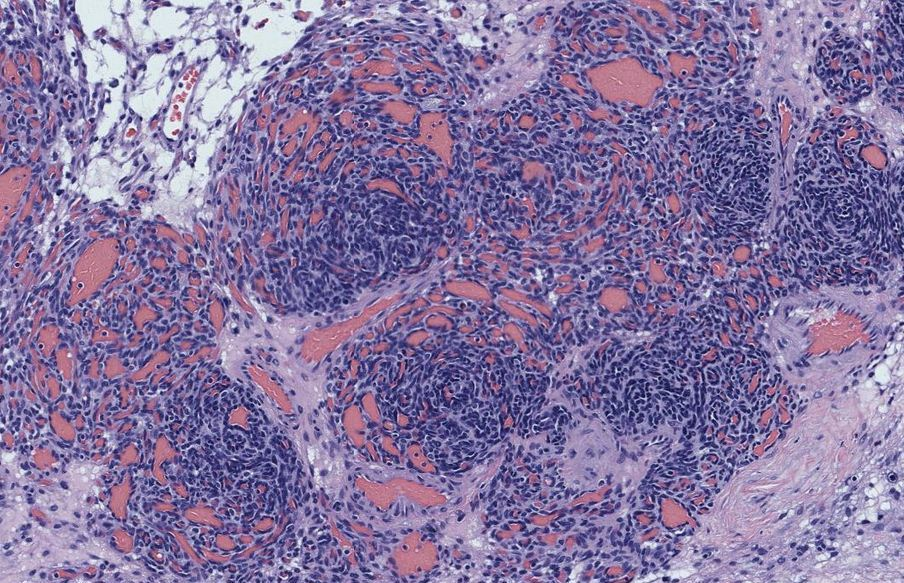
- Micrograph of a kaposiform hemangioendothelioma with "glomeruloid" nodules of endothelial cells.
- Specialty: Oncology

Hemangioendotheliomas are a family of vascular neoplasms of intermediate malignancy.

== Signs and symptoms ==
They have been described as masses that fall between a hemangioma and angiosarcoma. They are vascular tumors that commonly present with an enlarging mass and most commonly involve the lungs, liver, and musculoskeletal system, although many other body sites have been reported, including the head and neck, intestines, lymph nodes, pleura, retroperitoneum, heel, stomach.

== Cause ==
Possibly Bartonella spp bacteraemia

== Diagnosis ==
=== Classification ===
Hemangioendotheliomas may be classified as:

- Epithelioid hemangioendothelioma is an uncommon vascular tumor of intermediate malignancy that was first described by Steven Billings, Andrew Folpe, and Sharon Weiss in 2003. These tumors are so named because their histologic appearance resembles a proliferation of epithelioid cells, with polygonal shape and eosinophilic cytoplasm.
- Composite hemangioendothelioma is a low-grade angiosarcoma typically occurring in adults, although it has been described in infancy.
- Spindle-cell hemangioendothelioma) is a vascular tumor that was first described in 1986 by Sharon Weiss, M.D., and commonly presents in a child or young adult who develops blue nodules of firm consistency on a distal extremity. These tumors were reclassified by Dr. Weiss in 1996 as "spindle cell hemangioma", rather than hemangioendothelioma, due to the excellent prognosis observed in a group of 78 patients.
- Retiform hemangioendothelioma (also known as a "Hobnail hemangioendothelioma") is a low-grade angiosarcoma, first described in 1994, presenting as a slow-growing exophytic mass, dermal plaque, or subcutaneous nodule.
- Kaposiform hemangioendothelioma (also known as "Infantile kaposiform hemangioendothelioma") is an uncommon vascular tumor, first described by Niedt, Greco, et al. (Hemangioma with Kaposi's sarcoma-like features: report of two cases.(Niedt GW, Greco MA, Wieczorek R, Blanc WA, Knowles DM 2nd. that affects infants and young children, with rare cases having also been reported in adults. Pediatr Pathol. 1989;9(5):567-75.)
- Endovascular papillary angioendothelioma, also known as "Dabska tumor", "papillary intralymphatic angioendothelioma" (PILA), "Dabska-type hemangioendothelioma", "hobnail hemangioendothelioma", and "malignant endovascular papillary angioendothelioma", is a rare low-grade angiosarcoma of lymphatic channels. Approximately 30 such tumors have been described in the medical literature. Although included in the World Health Organization tumor classification, there is uncertainty as to whether EPA is a distinct entity or a heterogenous group of tumours. The lesion usually presents as a slow-growing tumor of the skin and subcutaneous tissues of the head, neck, or extremity, of infants or young children. However, EPA has involved the testicle, deep muscle tissue as a neoplastic transformation of a larger existing benign cavernous hemangioma, bone and spleen, and has been found in adults. Some reports indicate a good prognosis but metastasis is occasionally seen.
- Infantile hemangioendothelioma is a rare benign vascular tumour arising from mesenchymal tissue and is usually located in the liver. It often presents in infancy with cardiac failure because of extensive arteriovenous shunting within the lesion. It is the third most common liver tumor in children, the most common benign vascular tumor of the liver in infancy, and the most common symptomatic liver tumor during the first 6 months of life. These hemangioendotheliomas have 2 growth phases: an initial rapid growth phase, which is followed by a period of spontaneous involution (usually within the first 12 to 18 months of life). Detection of the hemangioendothelioma within the first 6 months of life is attributed to the initial rapid growth during this time; however, the tumor has been detected with fetal ultrasonography. Histopathologically, there are 2 types of hepatic hemangioendotheliomas:
  - Type I: Hemagioendotheliomas of this type have multiple vascular channels that are formed by an immature endothelial lining with stromal separation from bile ductules.
  - Type II: These hemangioendotheliomas have an appearance that is more disorganized and hypercellular, and there are no bile ductules.

In children, distinguishing between a primary malignant liver tumor (hepatoblastoma) and a benign primary hepatic lesion (hemangioendothelioma) is crucial. The absence of urinary catecholamines supports the diagnosis of hemangioendothelioma. In patients with hemangioendotheliomas, elevations in α_{1}-fetoprotein levels are milder than those found in patients with hepatoblastomas. Infantile hepatic hemangioendothelioma is strongly suggested by the presence of a vascular lesion on imaging studies. A complex, heterogeneous mass is often seen on ultrasonograms; a complex tumor that lacks central enhancement can be seen on CT scans; and the vascular nature of the lesion along with dilation of the aorta proximal to the origin of the celiac artery and a decrease in the diameter distally, indicating significant shunting, is seen on angiograms. Because most hemangioendotheliomas in infants sponanteously involute and regress within the first 12 to 18 months of life, asymptomatic lesions are generally managed conservatively. Infants who have severe anemia and/or thrombocytopenia can be given blood products; for those who have cardiac failure, diuretics and digoxin are often given. To stop further growth and to speed regression of lesions in infants with more significant clinical sequelae, treatment with corticosteroids or interferon-α-2a is administered. To slow the growth of tumors that are rapidly enlarging, chemotherapy and radiation therapy have been used. Surgical resection, partial hepatectomy, and embolization of afferent vessels should be considered for severe cases.

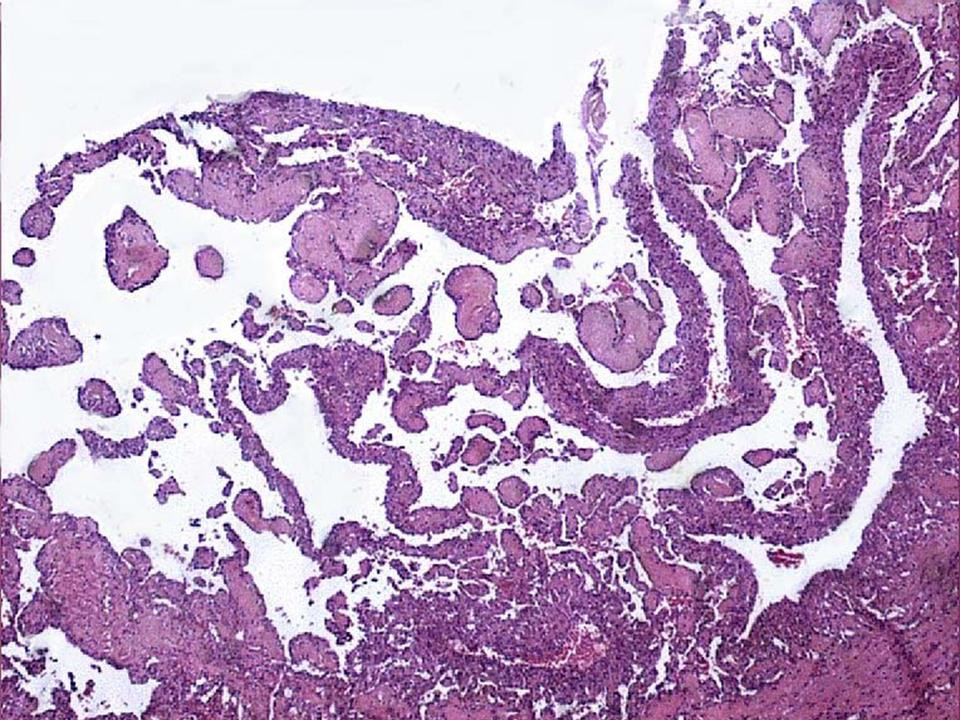
Low power photomicrograph of an endovascular papillary angioendothelioma showing papillae with hyalinized cores

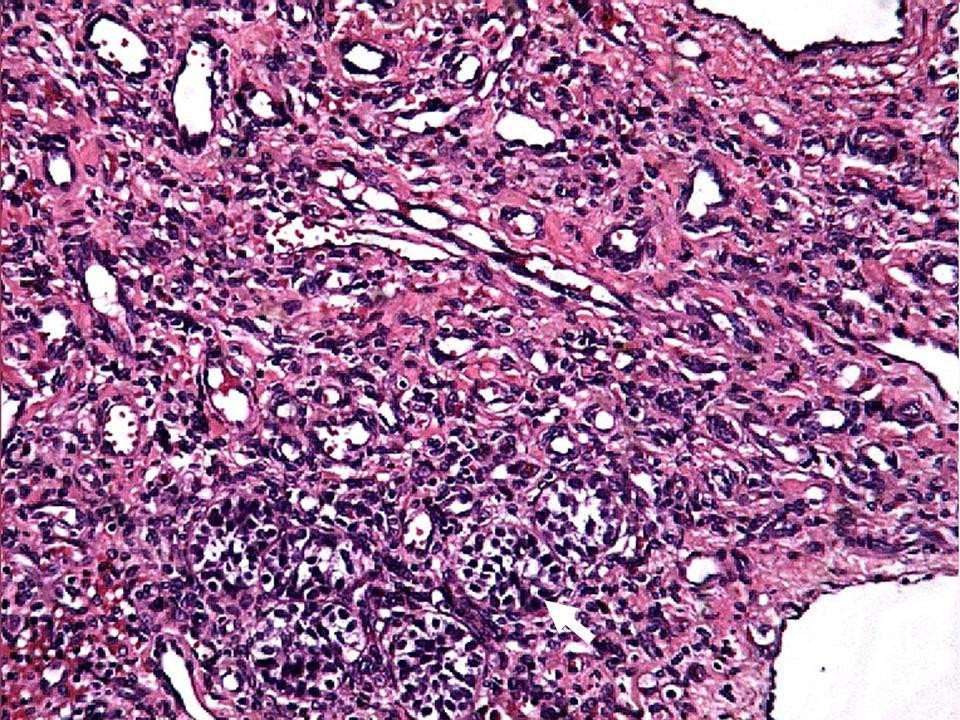
High power view showing a vascular tumor with cuboidal endothelium lining the vessels. Few entrapped seminiferous tubules are also noted (arrow).

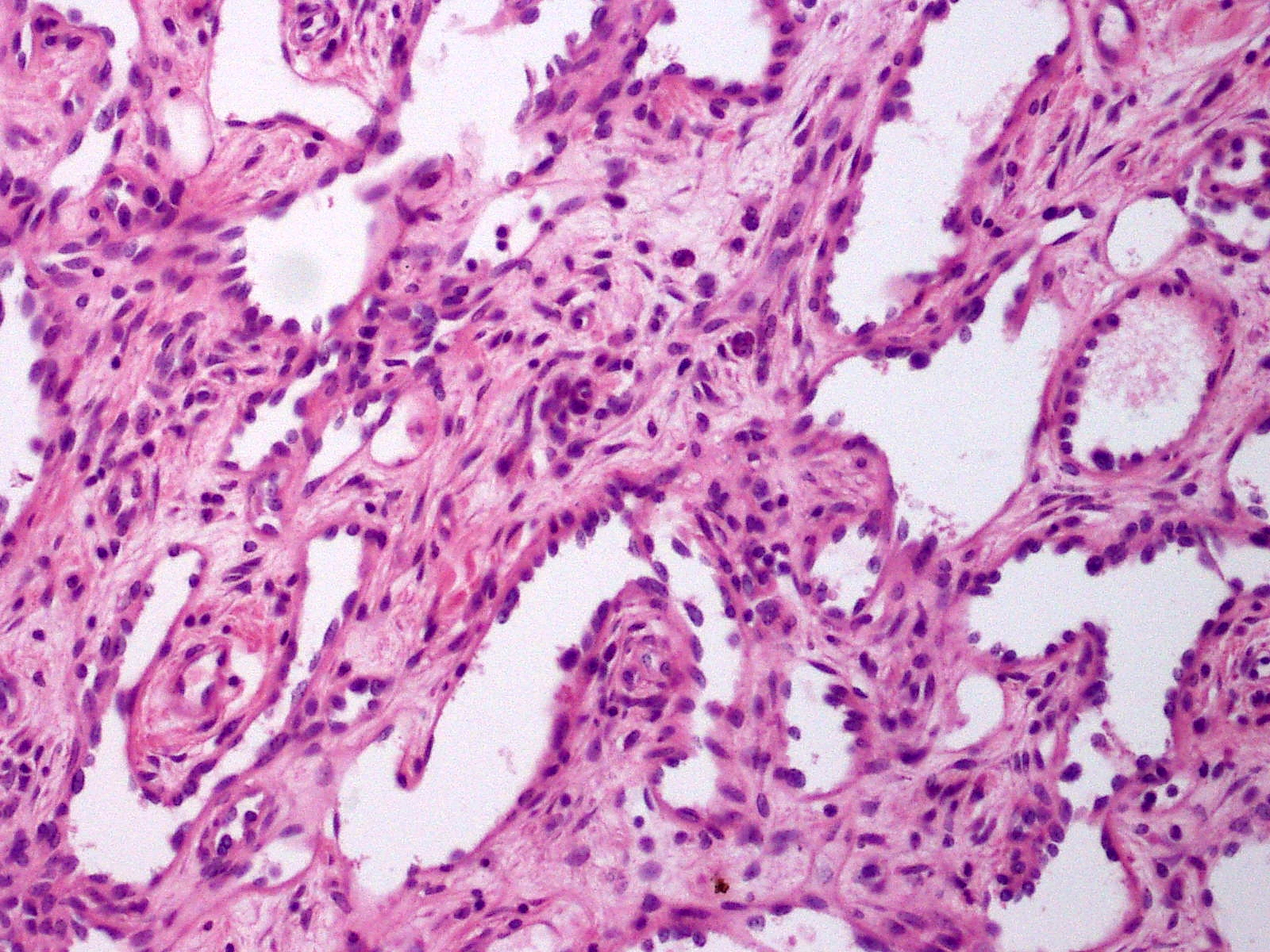
Characteristic budding, hobnail-like endothelial cells visible.

== Treatment ==
Treatment is varied and depends on the site and extent of tumor involvement, sites of metastasis, and specific individual factors. Surgical resection, radiotherapy, and chemotherapy have all been used to treat these masses, although studies on survival have yet to be conducted to delineate various treatment regimens. Kaposiform hemangioendothelioma might respond to chemotherapy or antiangiogenic therapies. Recently propanolol and steroids have been shown to be very effective in kaposiform hemangioendothelioma.
