= Kasabach–Merritt syndrome =

- Other names: Hemangioma-thrombocytopenia syndrome
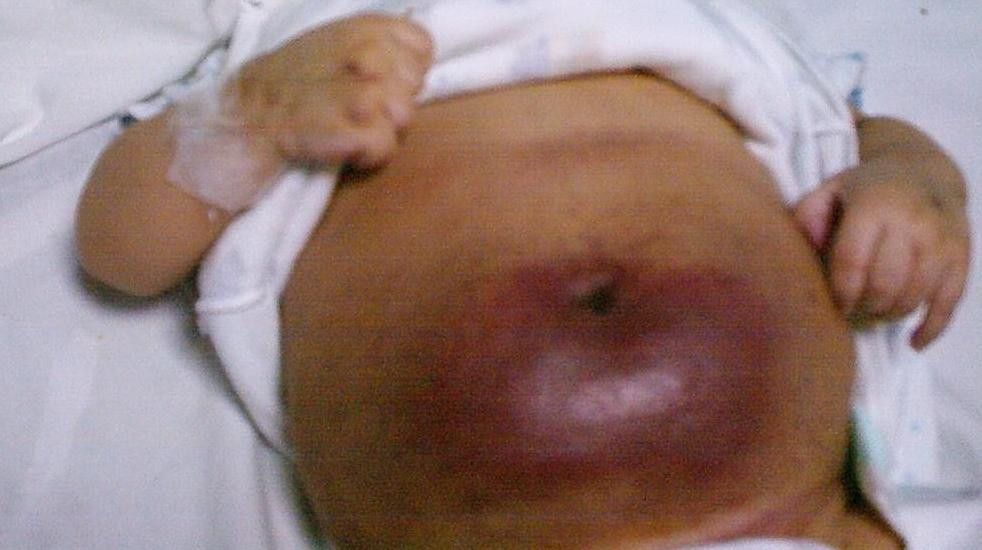
- Specialty: Hematology

Kasabach–Merritt syndrome (KMS), also known as hemangioma with thrombocytopenia, is a rare disease, usually of infants, in which a vascular tumor leads to decreased platelet counts and sometimes other bleeding problems, which can be life-threatening. It is also known as hemangioma thrombocytopenia syndrome. It is named after Haig Haigouni Kasabach and Katharine Krom Merritt, the two pediatricians who first described the condition in 1940.

== Signs and symptoms ==
Initially a vascular lesion is usually noted on the skin which can be firm and hard (indurated). Areas of tiny red dots (petechiae) can appear around the lesion or on other parts of the body. If the vascular lesion is internal, these petechiae and bruising can be seen on the skin. Bruising and spontaneous bleeding can also occur. The tumors are hemangiomas. They usually present in young infants, less than three months of age, but have also been reported in the toddler age group. These tumors occur in the extremities, chest, neck, abdomen and pelvis. They infiltrate across tissue and can be aggravated by interventions, infection and trauma. When the tumors associated with KMP are internal such as in the chest or abdomen, they can cause significant illness and can be life-threatening due to bleeding. Internal lesions can take a longer time to diagnose.

== Pathophysiology ==
Kasabach–Merritt syndrome is usually caused by a hemangioendothelioma or other vascular tumor, often present at birth. Although these tumors are relatively common, they only rarely cause Kasabach–Merritt syndrome.

When these tumors are large or are growing rapidly, sometimes they can trap platelets, causing severe thrombocytopenia. The combination of vascular tumor and consumptive thrombocytopenia defines Kasabach–Merritt syndrome. Tumors can be found in the trunk, upper and lower extremities, retroperitoneum, and in the cervical and facial areas.

This consumptive coagulopathy also uses up clotting factors, such as fibrinogen which may worsen bleeding. The coagulopathy can progress to disseminated intravascular coagulation and even death. Hemolytic anemia secondary to microangiopathic destruction (physical damage) of the RBCs can be expressed as mild, moderate, or severe.

== Diagnosis ==
The diagnostic workup is directed by the presenting signs and symptoms, and can involve:

- blood counts, clotting studies, and other laboratory testing
- imaging tests (ultrasound, CT scan, MRI, sometimes angiography, and rarely nuclear medicine scans)
- Biopsy of the tumor is contraindicated due to risk of bleeding.

Patients uniformly show severe thrombocytopenia, low fibrinogen levels, high fibrin degradation products (due to fibrinolysis), and microangiopathic hemolysis.

== Management ==
Management of Kasabach–Merritt syndrome, particularly in severe cases, can be complex and require the joint effort of multiple subspecialists. This is a rare disease with no consensus treatment guidelines or large randomized controlled trials to guide therapy.

=== Supportive care ===
Patient with Kasabach–Merritt syndrome can be extremely ill and may need intensive care. They are at risk of bleeding complications including intracranial hemorrhage. The thrombocytopenia and coagulopathy are managed with platelet transfusions and fresh frozen plasma, although caution is needed due to the risk of fluid overload and heart failure from multiple transfusions. The possibility of disseminated intravascular coagulation, a dangerous and difficult-to-manage condition, is concerning. Anticoagulant and antiplatelet medications can be used after careful assessment of the risks and benefits.

=== Definitive treatment ===
Generally, treatment of the underlying vascular tumor results in resolution of Kasabach–Merritt syndrome. If complete surgical resection is feasible, it provides a good opportunity for cure (although it can be dangerous to operate on a vascular tumor in a patient prone to bleeding, even with appropriate surgical subspecialists involved).

If surgery is not possible, various other techniques can be used to control the tumor:

- embolization (by interventional radiology) can limit the tumor's blood supply
- external compression bandages can have similar effects
- certain medications, including:
  - corticosteroids
  - alpha-interferon
  - chemotherapy (e.g. vincristine)
- radiation therapy has been used, often successfully, but now is avoided whenever possible due to the risk of long-term adverse effects (e.g. risk for future cancer).

== Prognosis ==
Kasabach–Merritt syndrome has a mortality rate of about 30%. For patients that survive the acute disease, supportive care may be required through a gradual recovery.Furthermore, patients may need care from a dermatologist or plastic surgeon for residual cosmetic lesions or an otolaryngologist for head & neck/airway involvement. On long-term followup, most patients have skin discoloration and/or mild disfiguration from the dormant tumor.

== See also ==
- List of cutaneous conditions
