= Trumpeter's wart =

- Specialty: Dermatology

A trumpeter's wart is a cutaneous condition characterized by a firm, fibrous, hyperkeratotic nodule on the upper lip of a trumpet player.
