= Pyogenic granuloma =

Vascular tumor on both mucosa and skin

- Other names: Eruptive hemangioma, granulation tissue-type hemangioma, granuloma gravidarum, lobular capillary hemangioma, pyogenic fibroma, pregnancy tumor, and tumor of pregnancy
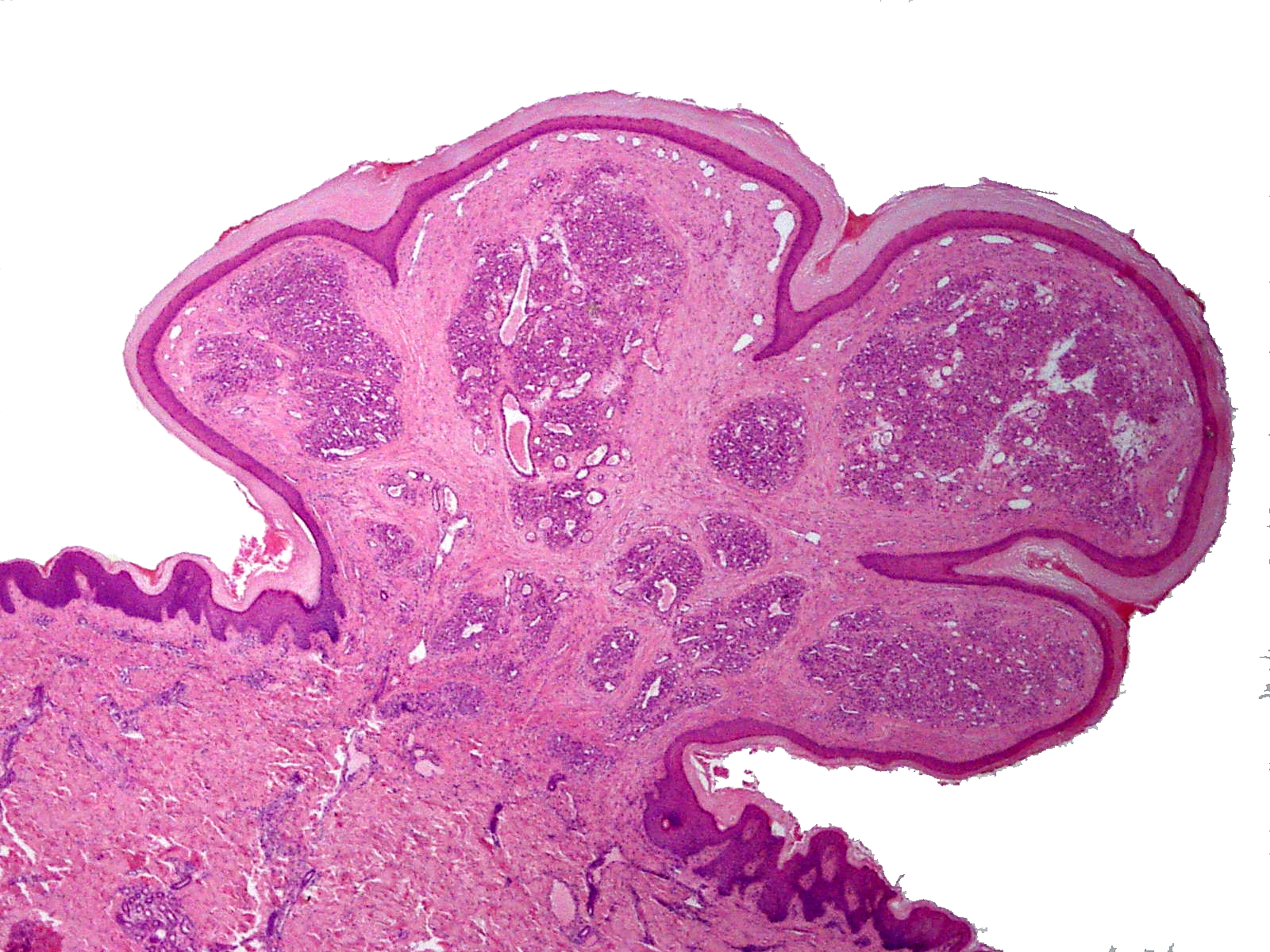
- Specialty: Dermatology

A pyogenic granuloma or lobular capillary hemangioma is a vascular tumor that occurs on both mucosa and skin, and appears as an overgrowth of tissue due to irritation, physical trauma, or hormonal factors. It is often found to involve the gums, skin, or nasal septum, and has also been found far from the head, such as in the thigh.

Pyogenic granulomas may be seen at any age, and are more common in females than males. In pregnant women, lesions may occur in the first trimester with an increasing incidence until the seventh month, and are often seen on the gums.

== Signs and symptoms ==
The appearance of pyogenic granuloma is usually a color ranging from red/pink to purple, grows rapidly, and can be smooth or mushroom-shaped. Younger lesions are more likely to be red because of their high number of blood vessels. Older lesions begin to change into a pink color. Size commonly ranges from a few millimeters to centimeters, though smaller or larger lesions may occur. A pyogenic granuloma can be painful, especially if located in an area of the body where it is constantly disturbed. Pyogenic granulomas can grow rapidly and often bleed profusely with little or no trauma. They may exude an oil-like substance, causing the surface to be damp. This is especially true if the granuloma is located on the scalp.

Epulis granulomatosum is a variant of pyogenic granuloma that forms only on gingiva, and is often seen forming in a recent extraction socket. Pyogenic granulomas appear on the gingiva in 75% of cases, more often in the maxillary than mandibular jaw. Anterior areas are more often affected than posterior areas. It can also be found on the lips, tongue, and inner cheek. Poor oral hygiene or trauma are usually precipitating factors.

One study has suggested a correlation between pyogenic granulomas and Bartonella seropositivity. However, this association has been questioned by others. The microscopic appearance of a pyogenic granuloma consists of highly vascular granulation tissue. Inflammation is present. The lesion may have a fibrous character if it is older, and the surface may have ulcerations. Pyogenic granulomas rarely occur in the conjunctiva, cornea, or connective tissue of the eye following minor local trauma. Grossly, these mass lesions resemble those occurring at more common sites. The relationship of these lesions to lobular capillary hemangiomas of skin and oropharyngeal mucosa commonly referred to as pyogenic granuloma is uncertain.

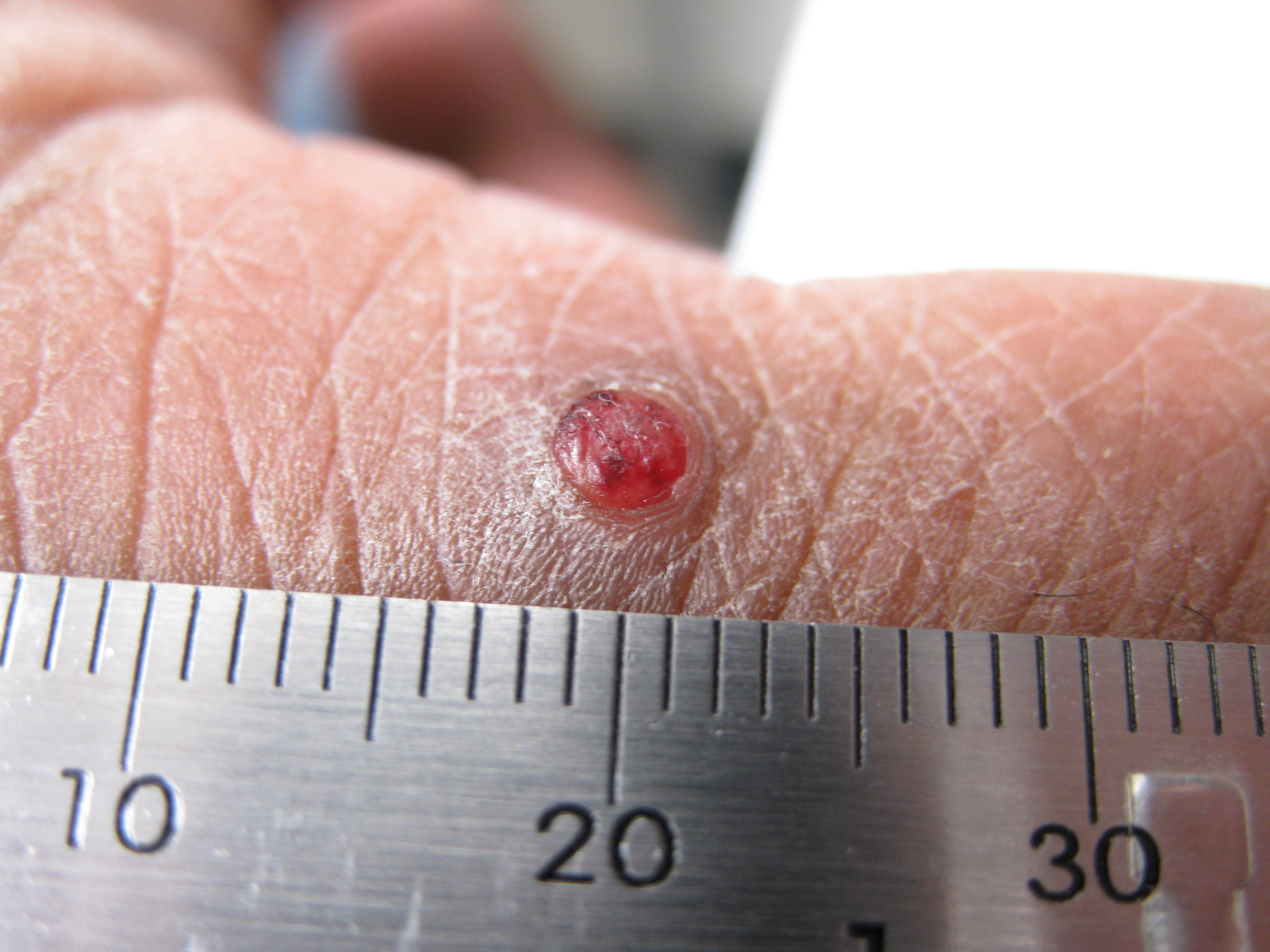

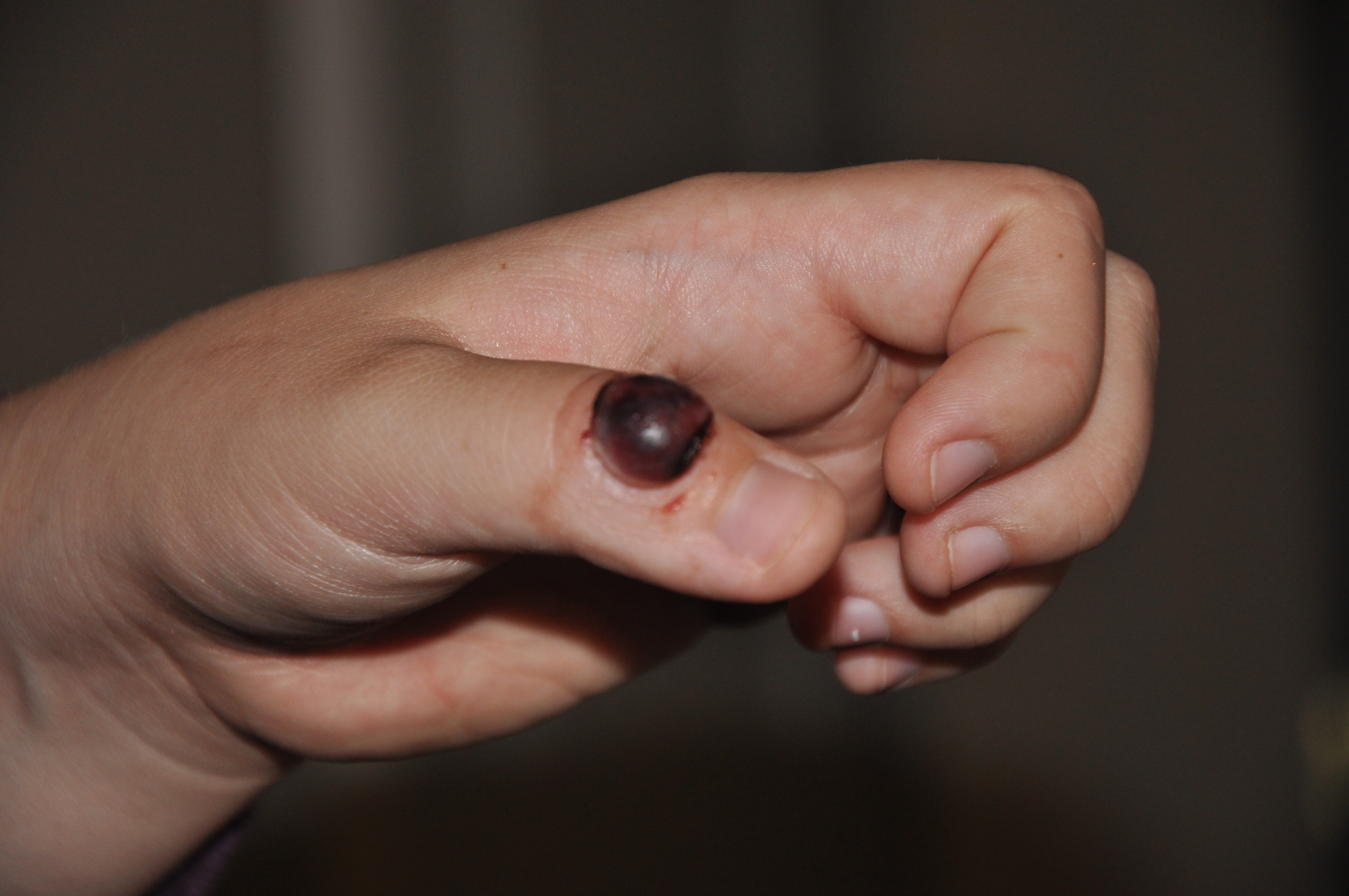

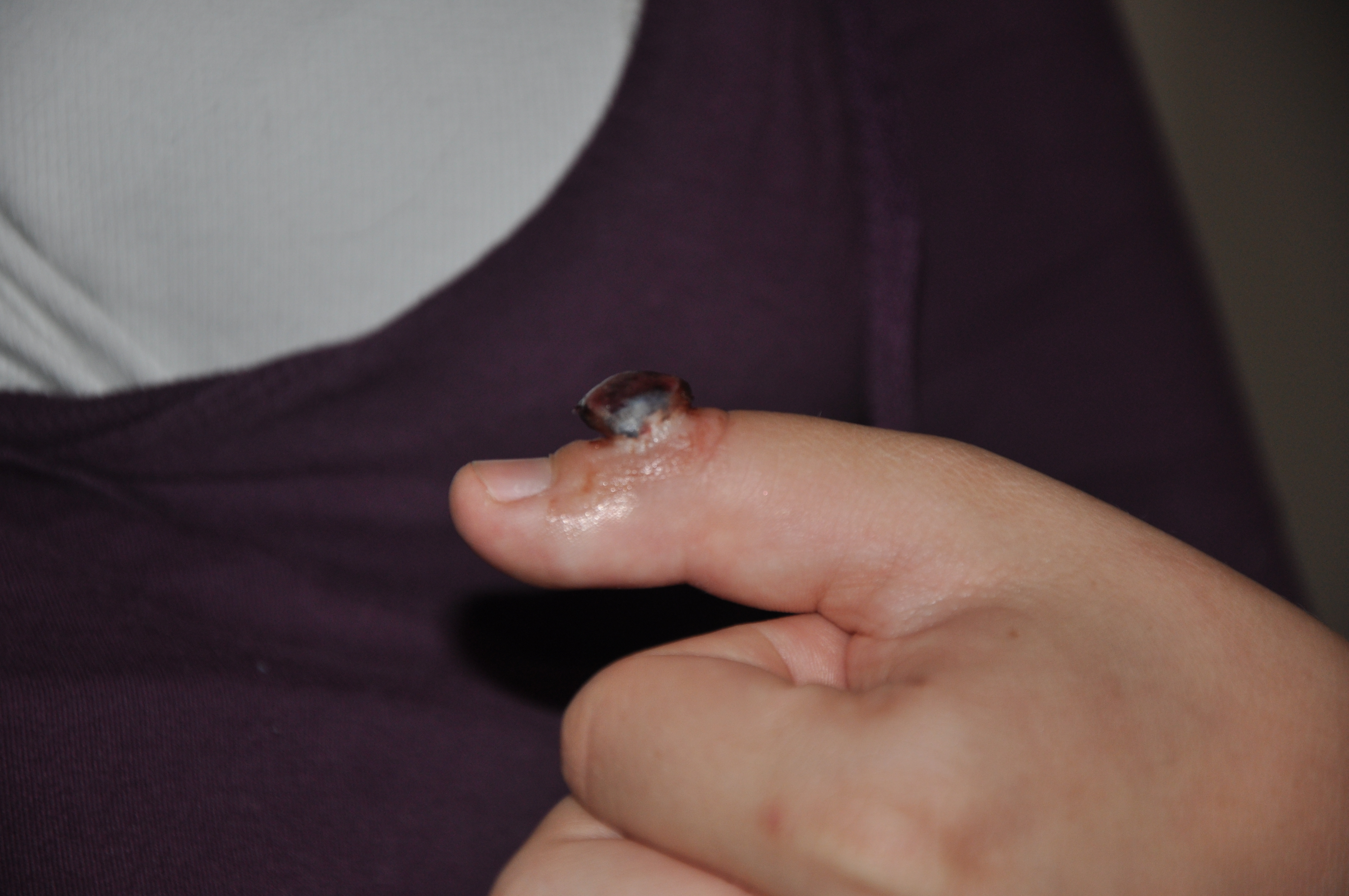

=== Associated conditions ===
Due to its overwhelming incidence on the gingiva, the condition is often associated with two other diseases, though not because they occur together. Instead, the three are associated with each other because they appear frequently on gingiva—peripheral giant cell granuloma and peripheral ossifying fibroma. Detailed analysis can be used to distinguish these conditions.

== Cause ==
Pyogenic granulomas are caused by proliferation of capillaries and are not caused by infection or cancer.

== Diagnosis ==
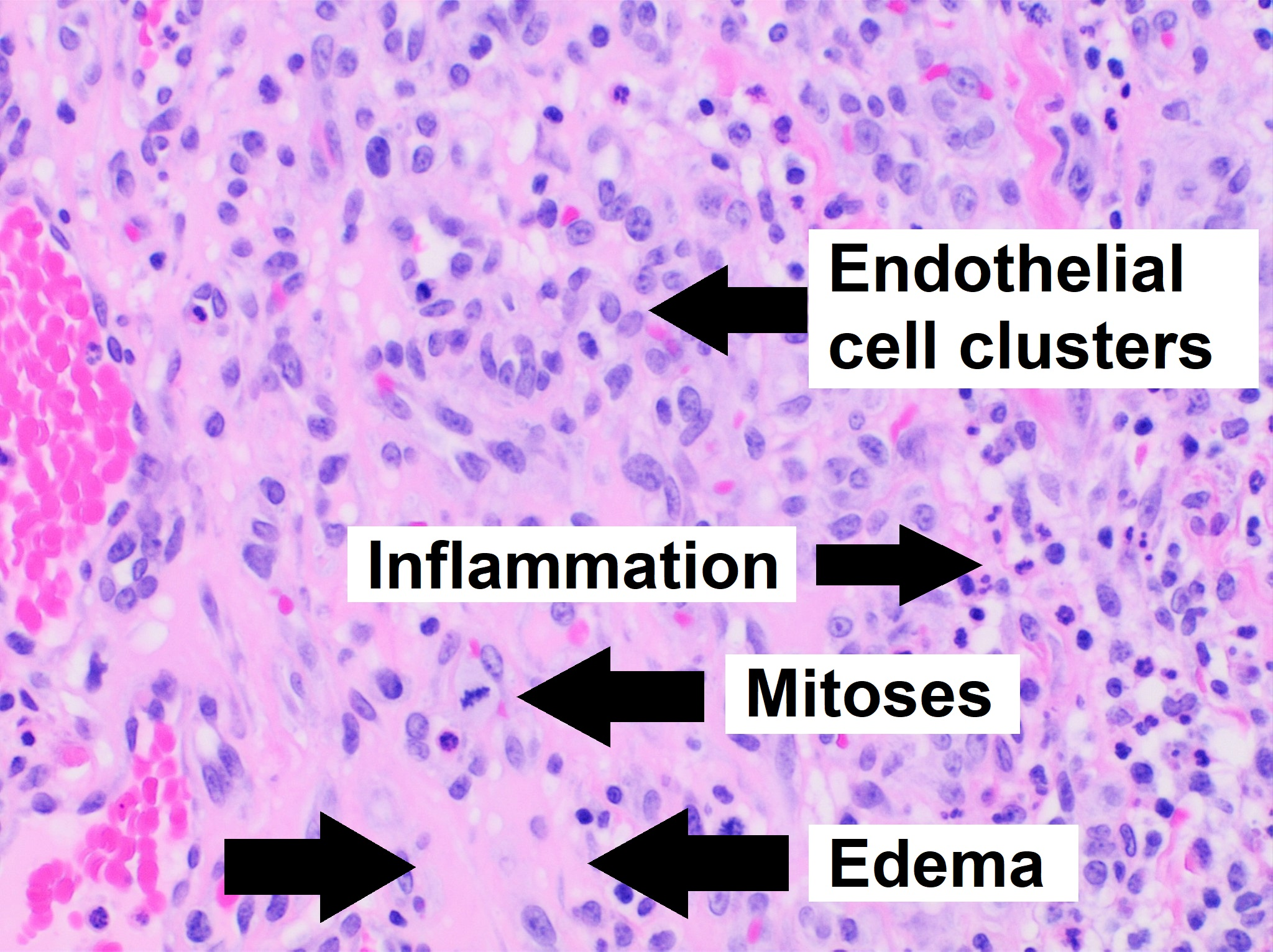
Characteristics of pyogenic granuloma on microscopy

A doctor likely can diagnose a pyogenic granuloma based on its appearance, and might perform a biopsy to make a more accurate diagnosis. A biopsy also helps rule out malignant (cancerous) medical conditions that can cause a similar kind of growth. These conditions include squamous-cell carcinoma, basal-cell carcinoma, and melanoma.

Histopathological examination shows multiple capillaries (due to the vascular nature of the tumor), neutrophils (pyogenic), and necrotic tissue.

== Management ==
Although pyogenic granulomas are not infectious or cancerous, treatment may be considered because of bleeding or ulceration. Frequently, they are treated with electrodesiccation (cauterization) and curettage (excision), though laser treatment using pulsed dye laser or CO_{2} laser is often effective.

Several reports have demonstrated the efficacy of topical application of the beta-adrenergic antagonist timolol in the treatment of pediatric pyogenic granuloma.

Usually, no treatment is used if the pyogenic granuloma occurs during pregnancy, since the lesion may heal spontaneously. Recurrent bleeding in either oral or nasal lesions may necessitate excision and cauterization sooner, however. If aesthetics are a concern, then treatment may be prioritized. Usually, only minor surgery may be needed, along with a dental cleaning for oral lesions to remove any calculus or other source of irritation.

== History ==
Pyogenic granulomas were first described in 1897 by two French surgeons, Antonin Poncet and Dor, who named these lesions botryomycosis hominis.

== Terminology ==
The name "pyogenic granuloma" is misleading, as it is neither pyogenic or a true granuloma. Rather, it is a capillary hemangioma of lobular subtype, which is why such a lesion is prone to bleeding. It is also not truly pyogenic (pus-producing), as the cause is hormonal or traumatic and has no association with infection or pus production.

== See also ==
- List of cutaneous conditions
- Trumpeter's wart
