= Giant-cell fibroma =

Type of fibroma

- Other names: GCF.
- Specialty: Dermatology, Dentistry.
- Usual onset: Typically 10-30 years old.
- Diagnostic method: Histopathology.
- Differential diagnosis: Retrocuspid papillae, Oral squamous papilloma, Verruciform xanthoma, and Irritation fibroma.
- Treatment: Surgical excision.
- Frequency: 2 - 5% of all oral benign fibrous growths.

Giant-cell fibroma is a benign localized fibrous mass. It often mimics other fibroepithelial growths and can be distinguished by its histopathology. The exact cause of giant-cell fibromas is unknown, and there is no evidence that they can be caused by irritation. Giant-cell fibromas can be removed by surgical incision, electrosurgery, or laser excision.

== Signs and symptoms ==
Giant-cell fibromas are commonly located on the gingiva. The tongue is the second most common location, followed by the palate or buccal mucosa. Giant-cell fibromas are usually asymptomatic and appear as 0.5-1 cm pedunculated or sessile lesions with a pebbly or bosselated surface.

== Diagnosis ==
Giant-cell fibromas are fibrous hyperplasic lesions and are diagnosed based on histopathological examination. Giant-cell fibromas are histologically distinguished by multinucleated giant cells and numerous large stellate or varying density in the collagenous stroma. The giant cells are typically seen adjacent to the epithelium in connective tissue. Some of these cells have stain characteristics of melanin and contain small brown granules. The overlying epithelium has long thin rate ridges and is hyperplatic. Sometimes an artifactual space dividing the surrounding fibrous stroma from the giant fibroblasts can be seen.

Histopathological giant fibroblasts can distinguish giant-cell fibromas from other lesions. Differential diagnosis includes an irritation fibroma, lipoma, retrocuspid papillae, peripheral ameloblastoma, focal fibrous hyperplasia, papilloma, intraoral neurilemmoma, odontogenic hamartoma, peripheral ossifying fibroma, peripheral adenomatoid odontogenic tumor, peripheral calcifying odontogenic cyst, and peripheral odontogenic fibroma.

== Treatment ==
The main treatment for Giant-cell fibromas is surgical excision however, electrosurgery or laser excision is the preferred treatment for children. The main advantage of electrosurgery is direct tissue hemostasis without needing sutures. Electrosurgery can also access difficult-to-reach areas and takes less time to perform. Laser treatments have been proposed as an alternative treatment option. Reoccurrence is rare and most cases of reoccurrence have been attributed to incomplete excision of the lesion.

== Epidemiology ==
Giant-cell fibroma mostly affects Caucasians and is very rare in other races. Most studies have shown a slight female predominance while however, a few have shown no predominance. Giant-cell fibromas represent about 1-5% of all biopsied fibrous lesions and around 0.4-1% of total biopsies. Giant-cell fibroma is diagnosed within the first three decades of life in approximately 60% of cases.

== History ==
In 1974 Weathers and Callihan first described the giant-cell fibroma. It was named after its unique large multinucleated and mononuclear stellate-shaped giant cells. Weathers and Callihan examined over 2,000 fibrous hyperplasias and 108 of them met their criteria for giant-cell fibroma. In 1982 Housten performed a study of 464 giant-cell fibromas at the Indiana University School of Dentistry and agreed that the giant-cell fibroma was truly a distinctive lesion.

== See also ==
- Irritation fibroma
- Giant cell
