= List of diseases (J) =

This is a list of diseases starting with the letter "J".

== Ja–Je ==
- Jackson–Weiss syndrome
- Jacobsen syndrome
- Jadassohn–Lewandowsky syndrome
- Jaffer–Beighton syndrome
- Jalili syndrome
- Jancar syndrome
- Jankovic–Rivera syndrome
- Jansen type metaphyseal chondrodysplasia
- Jansky–Bielschowsky disease
- Japanese encephalitis
- Jarcho–Levin syndrome
- Jejunal atresia
- Jensen syndrome
- Jequier–Kozlowski skeletal dysplasia
- Jervell and Lange-Nielsen syndrome
- Jeune syndrome situs inversus
- Jeune syndrome
- Jeune asphyxiating thoracic dystrophy

== Jo ==
- Job syndrome
- Johanson–Blizzard syndrome
- Johnson–Hall–Krous syndrome
- Johnson–Munson syndrome
- Johnston–Aarons–Schelley syndrome
- Joint hypermobility
- Jones–Hersh–Yusk syndrome
- Jones syndrome
- Jorgenson–Lenz syndrome
- Joseph disease
- Joubert syndrome bilateral chorioretinal coloboma
- Joubert syndrome

== Ju ==
- Juberg–Hayward syndrome
- Juberg–Marsidi syndrome
- Judge–Misch–Wright syndrome
- Jumping Frenchmen of Maine
- Jung–Wolff–Back–Stahl syndrome
- Juvenile dermatomyositis
- Juvenile gastrointestinal polyposis
- Juvenile gout
- Juvenile hyaline fibromatosis
- Juvenile macular degeneration hypotrichosis
- Juvenile muscular atrophy of the distal upper limb
- Juvenile myoclonic epilepsy
- Juvenile nephronophthisis
- Juvenile rheumatoid arthritis
- Juvenile temporal arteritis
- Juliannite nephronophthisis
