= Overgrowth =

Overgrowth may refer to:

== Botany and environment ==
- Shrub and weed growth
- Aufwuchs (German "surface growth" or "overgrowth") is the collection of small animals and plants that adhere to open surfaces

== Medicine and biology ==
- Hyperplasia
  - Inflammatory papillary hyperplasia, overgrowth of soft tissue, usually beneath a denture
- Overgrowth syndrome a group of genetic disorders in which there is an abnormal increase in the size of the body or a body part
- Small intestinal bacterial overgrowth
- Gingival overgrowth
- Pityrosporum folliculitis part of the normal skin flora, which overgrows in certain conditions
- Neural fibrolipoma overgrowth of fibro-fatty tissue along a nerve trunk that often leads to nerve compression
- Perlman syndrome a rare overgrowth disorder present at birth
- Achlorhydria complications of bacterial overgrowth and intestinal metaplasia and symptoms are often consistent with those
- Retinopathy most often resulting from neovascularization or blood vessel overgrowth
- Congenital hypertrophy of the lateral fold of the hallux condition involves "an overgrowth of the soft tissue" that can partially cover the nail plate
- Leontiasis ossea Lion Face Syndrome, is a rare medical condition, characterized by an overgrowth of the facial and cranial bones
- Hereditary gingival fibromatosis a rare condition of gingival overgrowth

== Other uses ==
- Overgrowth (video game), by Wolfire Games
