= Peripheral odontogenic fibroma =

- Other names: PFO
- Specialty: Dentistry

Peripheral odontogenic fibroma (PFO) is a fibrous connective tissue mass that is exophytic and covered in surface epithelium that contains odontogenic epithelium. The World Health Organization (WHO) classifies peripheral odontogenic fibroma as a fibroblastic neoplasm with variable amounts of odontogenic epithelium that appears to be dormant. Dentine and/or cementum-like material may be present.

== Signs and symptoms ==
Peripheral odontogenic fibroma manifests clinically as an infrequent, benign, unencapsulated exophytic mass that can be sessile or pedunculated, red or pink, smooth-surfaced, and ulcerated in some cases. It is frequently found on the attached gingiva, mainly in the molar and premolar regions, though it can be found anywhere in the jaw.

== Diagnosis ==
Clinically, there is no way to differentiate peripheral odontogenic fibroma from other common fibrous gingival lesions, including peripheral giant cell lesion, pyogenic granuloma, inflammatory fibrous hyperplasia, and peripheral ossifying fibroma. Rarely have diffuse or multifocal lesions been reported. Lesions that are larger may show signs of mineralization, although radiographic changes are uncommon, particularly in the early stages. Histopathologic features include a proliferation of relatively cellular fibrous or fibromyxomatous connective tissue with variable amounts of odontogenic epithelium and occasionally foci of calcification in the form of dentinoid, cementicles, or bone. These features are similar to those of the central odontogenic fibroma.

== Treatment ==
The preferred course of treatment is conservative local excision.

== Outlook ==
The rate of recurrence varies wildly. According to some studies, peripheral odontogenic fibroma has a low recurrence rate. One study showed a recurrence rate of 38.9%, while another study showed a recurrence rate of 50%.

== Epidemiology ==
The literature has reported a slight female predominance in this neoplasm, which occurs in a wide age range from the first to the ninth decades of life with a peak in the second and fourth decades.

== See also ==
- Peripheral ossifying fibroma
- Central odontogenic fibroma
