= Granuloma fissuratum =

Granuloma fissuratum may refer to:

- Acanthoma fissuratum
- Epulis fissuratum
