= Hereditary gingival fibromatosis =

- Other names: Autosomal dominant gingival hyperplasia, idiopathic gingival hyperplasia
- Specialty: Dentistry

Hereditary gingival fibromatosis (HGF), also known as idiopathic gingival hyperplasia, is a rare condition of gingival overgrowth. HGF is characterized as a benign, slowly progressive, nonhemorrhagic, fibrous enlargement of keratinized gingiva. It can cover teeth in various degrees, and can lead to aesthetic disfigurement. Fibrous enlargement is most common in areas of maxillary and mandibular tissues of both arches in the mouth. Phenotype and genotype frequency of HGF is 1:175,000 where males and females are equally affected but the cause is not entirely known. It mainly exists as an isolated abnormality but can also be associated with a multi-system syndrome.

== Signs and symptoms ==
There may or may not be any evidence of history of HGF in the family nor any usage of taking long-term medicines for any particular disease when it comes to diagnosing HGF. There also may or may not be any signs of medical and/or family history of intellectual disability, hypertrichosis, nor clinical symptoms that can be associated with gingival enlargement. Although, enlargement of gingiva, interdental papilla, hindered speech, and secondary inflammatory changes taking place in the mouth commonly at the marginal gingiva are all very indicative of this condition. Commonly the patient will have mandibular and maxilliary inflammation and overgrowth as opposed to the traditional pink, firm, and fleshy consistency of healthy gingiva. The patient's jaw may also appear distorted because of the gingiva enlargements. Overgrowth of the gingiva can range from slightly covering the surface of teeth or it can even completely cover the surrounding teeth. The patient can also experience damage or loss of teeth.

=== Obvious signs ===
- Most obvious sign is gingival overgrowth (overgrowth of the gums)
- Hindered chewing efficiency and difficulties eating
- Increasing mobility of teeth
- Abnormally shaped teeth and abnormal movement of teeth
- Inflammation and/or swelling of the gums/gingiva
- Not necessarily any signs of pain but experiencing pain is possible
- Difficulties in speaking, oftentimes can lead to speech disorders
- Other dental and oral problems
- In some cases, Hereditary Gingival Fibromatosis may cause bleeding from the gums, or gum ulcerations.

== Cause ==
Though much more research needs to be done, researchers have mostly agreed that a mutation in SOS1, son-of-sevenless gene, is responsible for this disease. SOS1 is a guanine nucleotide-exchange factor that functions in the transduction of signals that control cell growth and differentiation. A mutation in the SOS1 gene results in a single nucleotide insertion. Specific linkage studies have localized the mutation for isolated, nonsyndromic autosomal dominant forms of gingival fibromatosis to chromosomes 2 and 5, more specifically 2p21-p22 and 5q13-q22.

=== Genetic ===
HGF1 - Caused by a mutation in the SOS1 gene localized on chromosome 2p21-p22

HGF2 - Caused by a mutation in the SOS1 gene localized on chromosome 5q13-q22

Mutations in the RE1-silencing transcription factor (REST) gene can also cause this syndrome.

=== Non genetic ===
HGF may also be caused by unwanted side effects of pharmacological agents like phenytoin, ciclosporin, and some calcium-channel blockers, meaning HGF is a disease that can be drug-induced. However, there is little next to no research done in this area to support the claim.

- Inflammation
- Hormonal Imbalance
- Neoplasia
- More commonly associated with an autosomal dominant gene inheritance
- Multi-system syndromes: Zimmerman-Laband syndrome, Jones syndrome, Ramon syndrome, Rutherford syndrome, juvenile hyaline fibromatosis, systemic infantile hyalinosis, and mannosidosis
- Some unknown causes

== Mechanism ==
Genetic linkage studies are among the most popular methods of study to look at the mechanism of this HGF. Genetic linkage studies have found to localize genetic loci for autosomal dominant forms of HGF to chromosome 2p21-p22 (indicative of HGF1) and chromosome 5q13-q22 (indicative of HGF2). Chromosome 2p21-p22 has been refined to an interval of ~2.3 Mb to construct an integrated physical and genetic map of the 16 genes interval. Here, a mutation is found in sequencing these 16 genes.

There is an insertion of a cytosine between nucleotides 126,142 and 126,143 in codon 1083 of the SOS1 gene, meaning there is a mutation in SOS1. This causes a problem because SOS1 introduces a frameshift mutation and creates a premature stop codon. Also, it can segregate over generations, most commonly four. Once it causes a premature stop codon, the chromosome loses four important proline-rich SH-3 binding domains in the carboxyl-terminal region of the SOS1 protein. As a result, the N-terminal amino acids for SOS1 is fused into a 22–amino acid carboxyl terminus. Researchers claim that this mutation in the SOS1 gene is a probable primary cause of this disease but limited information supports the mechanism of this claim.

== Diagnosis ==
There are very few ways to test a patient for HGF. Currently, the most common way to diagnose a patient is by means of a physical evaluation. The physician can make a physical evaluation of the patient and send them to a dentist or better yet a specialist like a periodontist to evaluate signs of gingival overgrowth, quality of gingiva, inflammation, mechanical difficulties of the mouth, tooth conditions, and any sort of discomfort.

Aside from obvious physical symptoms seen in a physical evaluation, molecular tests can be run to check if there is a mutation in the SOS1 gene to confirm the diagnosis. If there is indeed a mutation in this gene coupled with the typical physical symptoms, then it is quite probable that a patient suffers from this disease. Also, looking at family history is also becoming more prominent in aiding to diagnose the patient. Otherwise, researchers are working to find new and better ways to test for the presence of HGF.

== Prevention ==
Since this condition is generally agreed upon to be hereditary, nothing can be done to prevent HGF. However, in some cases where it can develop as a result of rare multi-system syndromes, such as: Zimmerman-Laband, Jones, Ramon Syndrome, Rutherford Syndrome, Juvenile Hyaline Fibromatosis, Systemic Infantile Hyalinosis, and Mannosidosis, it is best for one to simply monitors the possible progression for HGF with regular dental check-ups.

If the patient's disease is treated by means of surgery, it is recommended that the patient undergoes post-surgical therapies for maintenance and periodic monitoring of gums for the sake of the possibility of re-occurrence of HGF.

== Treatment ==
This disease has not been shown to be life-threatening or the cause of death in patients. However, treatment is necessary to maintain a healthy lifestyle.

=== If left untreated ===
The following can occur if left untreated:

- Too much gingiva exposure
- Oral morbidity
- Chronic infection of areas between the gums and teeth, or at the gum line
- various degrees of Periodontitis - most likely due to the inability and difficulty of keeping the gingival margin and surrounding tissue clean due to the overgrowth
- Improper tooth eruption and/or complete prevention of tooth eruption as a result of too much gingiva exposure
- Systemic every-day troubles including functional and aesthetic problems of the mouth
- Malocclusion

=== Treatment ===
Most recent methods of treatment take the form of surgeries such as oral prophylaxis, followed by post-surgical therapies to monitor, provide proper oral hygiene, and correct the deformity. Although, the nature of recurrence post-treatment is virtually unknown, let alone what type of treatment is most effective for HGF. (SOURCE 2) In some cases, there is re-growth after surgical removal of the excess gingival tissues, in others there is minimal. No cases yet have shown any particular treatment or form of medicine to permanently remove HGF.

One type of procedure that can be executed is as follows: Removal of excess tissue under anesthesia through an internal bevel gingivectomy or undisplaced flap followed by gingivoplasty and continuous sling suture placements and periodontal dressing; after about a week of recovery after the surgery, remove sutures and periodically do observational evaluations to look for any signs of re-occurrence.

== Recent research ==
Some researchers suggest that HGF is transmitted as a Mendelian trait since both autosomal dominant and autosomal recessive transmission has been reported since the early 1970s. (SOURCE 1) In more recent scientific literature, there is evidence in which pedigree analyses confirm autosomal dominant, autosomal recessive or even as X-linked inherited cases of the HGF trait.

In 2002, researchers described the SOS1 gene and proved for the first time that a single-nucleotide–insertion mutation of the SOS1 gene on codon 1083 is the preliminary cause of HGF1 in humans. (Source 1) Later on in 2010, there was a case study done on a 16-year-old male with severe gingival overgrowth, almost covering all teeth. Researchers approached this issue with periodontics - a partial gingivectomy and flap surgery. This case study concluded that surgery followed by regular follow-ups is a good way to treat HGF despite the fact that the risks of re-occurrence of the condition remain high.

Even more recently, a study was done in 2013 on a family that showed history of autosomal recessive inheritance of HGF. The study did not dismiss the return of HGF after treatment but did claim that general surgical intervention after scaling and root planning of teeth supplemented with good oral hygiene is good enough to prevent the re-occurrence of HGF. This case study also acknowledged how HGF can be part of a multi-system syndrome associated with disorders such as Zimmermann Laband syndrome (ear, nose, bone, and nail defects with hepatosplenomegaly), Rutherford syndrome (microphthalmia, mental retardation, athetosis, and hypopigmentation), Murray-Puretic Drescher syndrome and Ramon syndrome.

== See also ==
- Chronic periodontitis
- Epidemiology of periodontal diseases
- Gingivitis
- Gum graft
- Periodontist
- Tooth loss
- Gingival recession
