= Non-ossifying fibroma =

Benign bone tumor type

- Other names: Fibroxanthoma
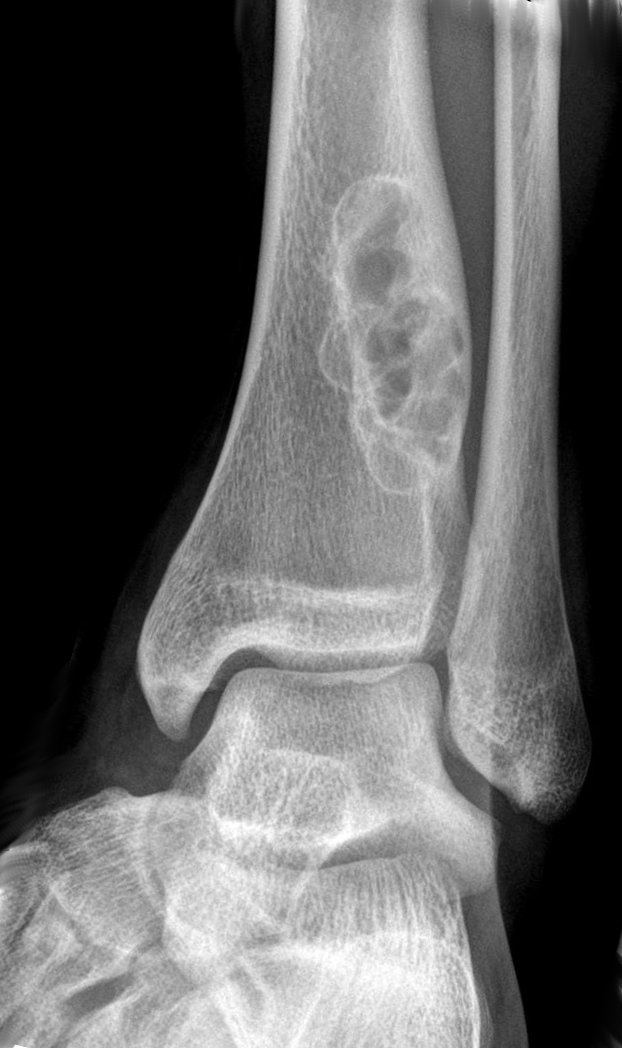
- X-ray of nonossifying fibroma of distal tibia.
- Specialty: Rheumatology

A non-ossifying fibroma (NOF) is a benign bone tumor of the osteoclastic, giant cell-rich tumor type. It generally occurs in the metaphysis of long bones in children and adolescents. Typically, there are no symptoms unless there is a fracture. It can occur as part of a syndrome such as when multiple non-ossifying fibromas occur in neurofibromatosis, or Jaffe–Campanacci syndrome in combination with cafe-au-lait spots, intellectual disabilities, hypogonadism, eye and cardiovascular abnormalities.

Diagnosis is by X-ray or MRI, usually when investigating a person for something else. Medical imaging typically shows a well defined radiolucent lesion, with a distinct multilocular appearance, sometimes looking like bubbles. It is usually around 1–2 cm in size, but be as large as 7 cm. They consist of foci consist of collagen rich connective tissue, fibroblasts, histiocytes and osteoclasts. Usually no treatment is required. Surgical curettage and bone grafting may be required if it is large.

It is found in 30–40% of children and adolescents, but rare in adults as most have resolved by this time. They do not become malignant. It affects twice as many males as females. A NOF was identified on the mandible of Qafzeh 9, an early anatomically modern human dated to 90,000–100,000 years B.P.

== Signs and symptoms ==
Most people with non-ossifying fibroma have no symptoms. If the tumor is large, there may be pain over the affected area, a pathological fracture, and the affected limb might not function properly. It can occur as part of a syndrome such as when multiple non-ossifying fibromas occur in neurofibromatosis, or Jaffe–Campanacci syndrome in combination with cafe-au-lait spots, intellectual disabilities, hypogonadism, eye and cardiovascular abnormalities.

== Diagnosis ==
It is usually diagnosed by x-ray or MRI, when investigating another problem. The tumor presents as a well defined radiolucent lesion, with a distinct multilocular appearance, sometimes looking like a "soap bubble". If small and no symptoms, then biopsy is not needed.

== Additional images ==
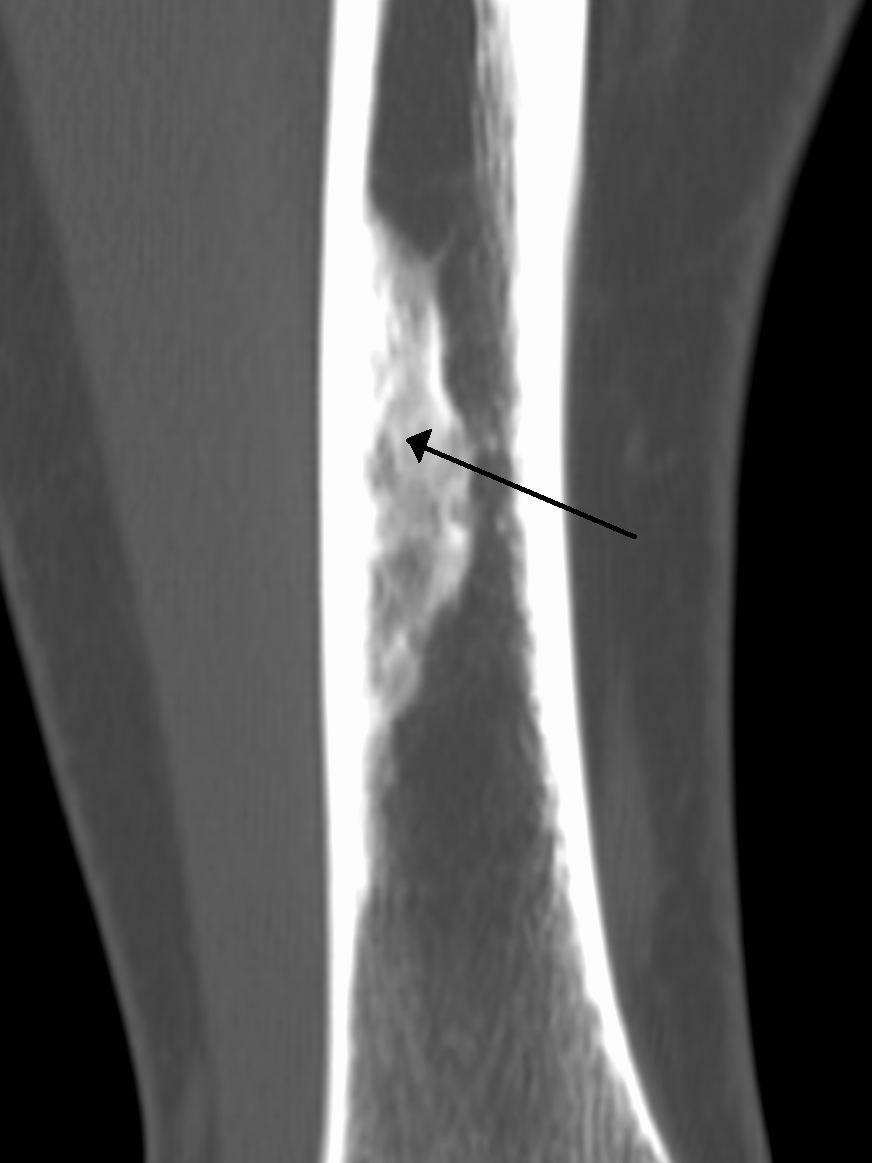
An ossified non-ossifying fibroma on CT

== See also ==
- Fibroma
- Ossifying fibroma
