= Epulis fissuratum =

Benign hyperplasia of fibrous connective tissue

- Other names: Inflammatory fibrous hyperplasia, Denture-induced fibrous inflammatory hyperplasia, Denture injury tumor, Denture epulis, Denture induced granuloma, and Granuloma fissuratum)

Epulis fissuratum is a benign hyperplasia of fibrous connective tissue which develops as a reactive lesion to chronic mechanical irritation produced by the flange of a poorly fitting denture. More simply, epulis fissuratum is where excess folds of firm tissue form inside the mouth, as a result of rubbing on the edge of dentures that do not fit well. It is a harmless condition and does not represent oral cancer. Treatment is by simple surgical removal of the lesion, and also by adjustment of the denture or provision of a new denture.

It is a closely related condition to inflammatory papillary hyperplasia, but the appearance and location differs.

== Signs and symptoms ==
The lesion is usually painless. The usual appearance is of two excess tissue folds in alveolar vestibule/buccal sulcus, with the flange of the denture fitting in between the two folds. It may occur in either the maxillary or mandibular sulci, although the latter is more usual. Anterior locations are more common than posterior. Less commonly there may be a single fold, and the lesion may appear on the lingual surface of the mandibular alveolar ridge.

The swelling is firm and fibrous, with a smooth, pink surface. The surface may also show ulceration or erythema. The size of the lesion varies from less than 1 cm to involving the entire length of the sulcus.

== Causes ==
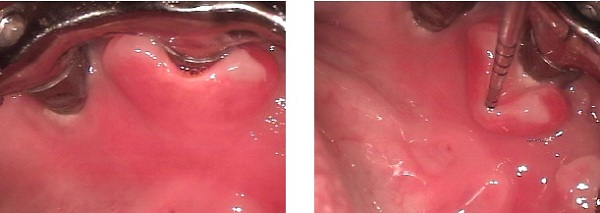
Fibrous hyperplasia around a dental implant, caused by a broken denture clasp.

The cause is usually pressure from the flange of a denture which causes chronic irritation and a hyperplastic response in the soft tissues. Women during pregnancy can also present with an epulis, which will resolve after birth. Fibroepithelial polyps, pedunculated lesions of the palate beneath an upper denture, are associated with this condition. A cobble-stone appearance similar to an epulis fissuratum in a patient without dentures can be diagnostic of Crohn's disease. Epulis fissuratum can also appear around dental implants.

== Diagnosis ==
The diagnosis is made clinically, and usually this is clear cut if the lesion is associated with the flange of a complete denture. Tissue biopsy is not usually indicated before removal of the lesion, since the excises surgical specimen is usually sent for histopathologic examination and the diagnosis is confirmed retrospectively. Rarely, incisional biopsy may be indicated to rule out neoplasia, e.g. in the presence of suspicious ulceration. The appearance may also be confused with pyogenic granuloma.

The excessive tissue is composed of cellular, inflamed fibrous connective tissue. The appearance of an epulis fissuratum microscopically is an overgrowth of cells from the fibrous connective tissue. The epithelial cells are usually hyperkeratotic and irregular, hyperplastic rete ridges are often seen.

=== Classification ===
Epulis (literally, 'on the gingiva') is a general term for any gingival or alveolar tumor (i.e. lump on the gum). This term describes only the location of a lump and has no implication on the histologic appearance of a lesion. Epulis is also sometimes used synonymously with epulis fissuratum, however other conditions are classified as epulides, e.g. giant cell epulis (peripheral giant cell granuloma), ossifying fibroid epulis (peripheral ossifying fibroma), and congenital epulis.

== Treatment ==
Treatment is by surgical excision (complete removal) of the fibrous tissue overgrowth and addressing the causative factor to prevent recurrence of the lesion. Other sources suggest that surgical excision may not be required in all cases. Common techniques for removal of the excess tissue include traditional removal with a surgical scalpel, electrical scalpel, or laser excision with a laser scalpel, e.g. a carbon dioxide laser, erbium:YAG laser, Neodymium-YAG laser, or diode laser. The poorly fitting denture can be adapted to fit better (a "reline") or a new denture constructed. Alternatively, the section of flange that is sharp/over-extended can be smoothed and reduced with a drill.

== Prognosis ==
If the causative factor persists, tissue will become more fibrous over time.

== Epidemiology ==
This condition occurs in association with denture wearing, and so those affected tend to be middle aged or older adults. 66-75% are estimated to occur in women. Epulis fissuratum is the third most common reactive lesion that occurs in the mouth, after peripheral giant cell granuloma and pyogenic granuloma.
