= CGCG =

CGCG may refer to:

- Catalogue of Galaxies and of Clusters of Galaxies
- Central giant-cell granuloma, a localised benign condition of the jaws
- CGCG, Inc., a Taiwan CGI computer animation studio owned by Wang Film Productions
