= Medication-induced hyperlipoproteinemia =

- Specialty: Dermatology

Medication-induced hyperlipoproteinemia is a condition that results from the decreasing of lipoprotein lipase activity resulting in eruptive xanthomas.

== See also ==
- Normolipoproteinemic xanthomatosis
- Cerebrotendinous xanthomatosis
- Skin lesion
