= Inflammatory papillary hyperplasia =

- Other names: Palatal papillomatosis, palatal epithelial hyperplasia, denture papillomatosis papillary hyperplasia of the palate
- Specialty: Dentistry, ENT surgery

Inflammatory papillary hyperplasia (IPH) is a benign lesion of the oral mucosa which is characterized by the growth of one or more nodular lesions, measuring about 2mm or less. The lesion almost exclusively involves the hard palate, and in rare instances, it also has been seen on the mandible. The lesion is mostly asymptomatic and color of the mucosa may vary from pink to red.

In general, IPH is associated with the use of removable upper dentures, although it also has been found in dentulous patients with no history of a dental prosthesis.

The majority of lesions are found beneath ill-fitting dentures of long use and in patients who do not take their dentures out overnight. The lesion seems to result from a combination of chronic, mild trauma which permit frictional irritation. A poor fitting denture never acquires papillomatosis. However, there must be some unidentified predisposing factors present in those patients who develop the lesion. It is also induced by low-grade infection by bacteria or Candida yeast. It is occasionally seen in patients without dentures but with high palatal vaults or those with habit of breathing through the mouth.

== Signs and symptoms ==
Papillary hyperplasia is seen in middle-aged and older persons, and there is a strong female predilection (2:1). The disease occurs on the bone-bound oral mucosa of the hard palate and alveolar ridges. Inflammatory papillary hyperplasia is usually asymptomatic. It presents as a cluster of individual papules or nodules that may be erythematous, somewhat translucent, or normal in surface coloration. Mucosa is erythematous and has a pebbly or papillary surface. Many cases are associated with denture stomatitis.

Often the entire vault of the hard palate is involved, with the alveolar mucosa being largely spared. White cottage cheese–like colonies of Candida may be seen in clefts between papules. There is seldom pain, but a burning sensation may be produced by the yeast infection. Early papules are more edematous, whereas older ones are more fibrotic and firm, being individually indistinguishable from irritation fibroma.

Candida -associated palatal papillary hyperplasia also has been reported in dentate patients with human immunodeficiency virus (HIV) infection.

== Cause ==
The origin of the lesion is unclear. This condition appears to be of an inflammatory nature.

An excessive denture palatal relief area, creating a void between the denture base and the tissue of the palate, encourages food entrapment and so encouraging bacterial and fungal growth between the two surfaces. This was demonstrated in 80 per cent of the patients.

The other causes may include ill-fitting or poorly contoured dentures, irritation of the palatal salivary glands poor oral hygiene and continuous day and night denture use.

ll-fitting or poorly contoured dentures can result in excessive frictional movement of the denture bases on the oral mucosa, creating the chances of developing inflammatory papillary hyperplasia.

Inflammatory papillary hyperplasia is commonly associated with Candida infection. Strong correlation between denture stomatitis and poor hygiene in the use of prostheses have been found in a few studies in Brazil. Denture stomatitis is the most frequent denture related mucosal lesion and is always associated with Candida albicans. Colonization of Candida albicans is caused by poor oral hygiene. However, Candida albicans infection is an opportunistic event and is not consequential for developing denture stomatitis and inflammatory papillary hyperplasia.

Gender was also found to be another significant factor from studies in Brazil. Females usually live longer than men, causing more tooth loss to happen among women and more women wear dentures (and for longer periods) than men. Hence, women have higher chance of getting inflammatory papillary hyperplasia. Oral mucosa of women is more susceptible to hyperplastic change than that of men due to postmenopausal changes to the oral mucosa,

== Diagnosis ==
=== Classification ===
This has been generally based on the clinical appearance of the inflamed mucosa seen under maxillary complete dentures. The classification of Newton (1962) has been the most widely used. He proposed three types: (1) Pinpoint hyperaemic foci, (2) Diffuse hyperaemia of denture-supporting tissues, and (3) Papillary hyperplasia. Budtz-Jorgensen & Bertram (1970) used different terminology for the same changes: (1) Simple localized inflammation, (2) Simple diffuse (generalized) inflammation, and (3) Granular inflammation. Bergendal (1982) included only diffuse and papillary varieties and referred to atrophic or hyperplastic denture stomatitis.

Inflammatory papillary hyperplasia is a hyperplasia (overgrowth) of soft tissue, usually beneath a denture. It is associated with poor denture hygiene, denture overuse, and ill-fitting dentures.

It is a closely related condition to inflammatory fibrous hyperplasia (epulis fissuratum), but the appearance and location differs.

=== Histopathology ===
Epithelium is able to grow into the subjacent connective tissue in response to chronic inflammation. Mild trauma, and constant irritation to the oral mucosa histologically manifests as acanthosis and hyperparakeratosis. This defensive thickening is a primary function of epithelium.

Histopathologically, numerous papillary projections are usually covered by hyperplastic stratified squamous epithelium with or without chronic inflammation. Pseudoepitheliomatous appearance can be seen In advanced cases, this hyperplasia is pseudoepitheliomatous in appearance.

A chronic inflammatory cell infiltrate containing lymphocytes and plasma cells is usually seen, Rarely, polymorphonuclear leukocytes are also present. Proliferation of fibrovascular tissue occurs in nodules with a variable lymphoplasmacytic infiltrate.

=== Differential diagnosis ===
- Inflamed squamous papilloma: usually solitary and pedunculated.
- Human papillomavirus–associated papillary lesions or condylomas: they contain koilocytes

== Treatment ==
For early lesions of inflammatory papillary hyperplasia, cessation of denture use for 2 to 4 weeks may allow the lesion to completely subside. This may be aided by use of topical antibiotic or antifungal therapies. Small lesions are also typically treated with mouthrinses such as chlorhexidine mouthrinse at 0.12% or antifungal mouthrinse/gels.

For more advanced and large lesions, excision of the hyperplastic tissue may be required before fabricating a new denture. Several surgical methods have been used, including:

- Partial-thickness or full-thickness surgical blade excision
- Electrosurgery
- Curettage
- Laser surgery
- Cryosurgery

Lesions removed by electrosurgery require an average of 30 to 33 days to heal, whereas lesions removed by surgical curettage require around 21 to 23 healing days. During healing interval, the existing denture can be lined with a temporary tissue conditioner that acts as a palatal dressing and provides greater comfort. Surgical removal of the lesion and the making of new dentures are effective in eradication of the lesion.

Good oral hygiene practice is very important in preventing repetition of events leading to the condition again. Proper denture hygiene care should be carried out as instructed by your dentist and nocturnal use of dentures should be eliminated.

== Epidemiology ==
Due to the strong association with denture-wearing, the lesion tends to occur more in adults than children. There is no gender predilection. In people who wear dentures 24 hours a day, its incidence is around 20%.

Inflammatory papillary hyperplasia almost exclusively involves the hard palate, specifically the vault of the palate. Extension of the lesion to the mucosa of the residual ridges have also been observed. 11% to 13.9% of patients who wear maxillary complete dentures with complete palatal coverage has been reported to have IPH.
