= Verruciform xanthoma =

- Specialty: Dermatology

Verruciform xanthoma is an uncommon benign lesion that has a verruciform (wart-like) appearance, but it may appear polypoid, papillomatous, or sessile. The verruciform was first described by Shafer in 1971 on the oral mucosa. Usually found on the oral mucosa of middle-aged persons, verruciform xanthomas have also been reported on the scrotum and penis of middle-aged to elderly Japanese males. While the most common site is the oral mucosa, lesions that occur elsewhere usually arise on the perineum or on the skin with some predisposing factor, such as lymphedema or an epidermal nevus.

== Signs and symptoms ==
The most common location by far is the gingival margin and other areas of the masticatory oral mucosa, these occur more frequently in the fifth decade of life, and have good prognosis, the treatment of choice for oral VXs is surgical excision, and recurrence is rare.

The condition can affect other organs of body, such as the penis, vulva, and can occur in anal region, nose, the ear, lower extremity, scrotum.

== Cause ==
Verruciform xanthoma is most likely not a human papillomavirus associated lesion and the foam cells in the lesions are most likely derived from the monocyte—macrophage lineage. More research is needed to determine the cause.

== Diagnosis ==
=== Histology ===
A distinguishing feature of verruciform xanthoma is the presence of large numbers of lipid-laden foamy histiocytes in the lesion, and essentially limited to, the connective tissue papillae in the lesion. The lesions are solitary, raised, or polypoid with cup-shaped craters filled with parakeratotic cells that blend into keratinocytes of an acanthotic and papillomatous epidermis. There is a neutrophilic infiltrate of varying intensity between plump parakeratotic cells and keratinocytes, near the surface of the epidermis. The xanthoma cells contain periodic acid Schiff positive, diastase resistant granules. The foam cells are monocyte-macrophage lineage with positive immunohistochemical markers for CD68 (KP1) and cathepsin B.

=== Differential diagnosis ===
Differential diagnosis includes seborrheic keratosis, verruca simplex, condyloma acuminatum, granular cell myoblastoma, vulvar intraepithelial neoplasia, bowenoid papulosis, erythroplasia of Queyrat, and verrucous carcinoma

== Treatment ==
Surgical excision is the treatment of choice.

== Epidemiology ==
Verruciform xanthoma is uncommon, with a female:male ratio of 1:1.1

== See also ==
- Normolipoproteinemic xanthomatosis
- List of cutaneous conditions
