= Adamantinoma =

Rare bone tumor in the lower leg

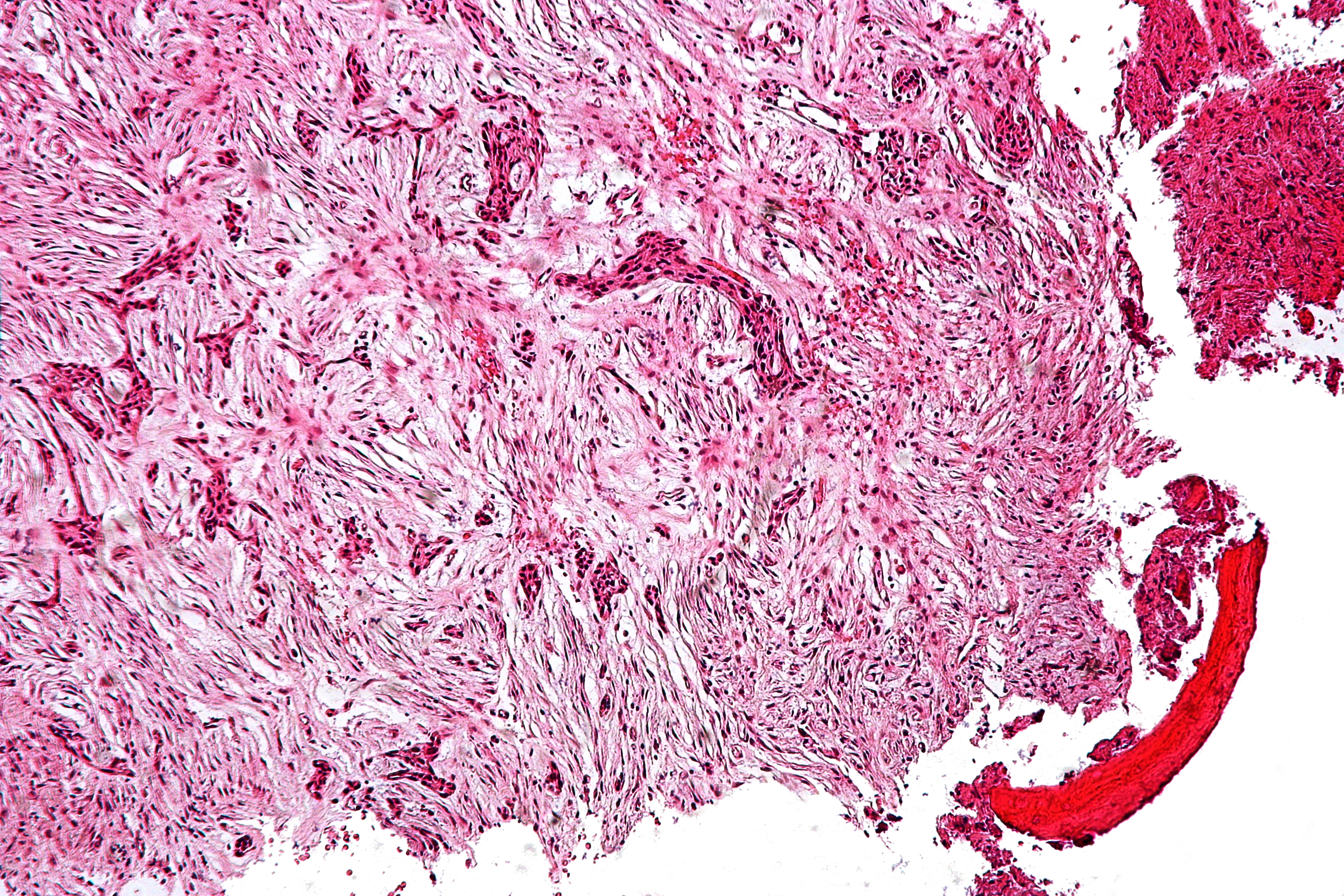
- Micrograph (using H&E stain) of an adamantinoma showing the biphasic histomorphology.
- Specialty: Oncology, rheumatology

Adamantinoma (from Greek adamantinos 'very hard') is a rare bone cancer, making up less than 1% of all bone cancers. It almost always occurs in the bones of the lower leg and involves both epithelial and osteofibrous tissue.

The condition was first described by Fischer in 1913.

== Presentation ==
Patients typically present with swelling with or without pain. The slow-growing tumor predominantly arises in long bones in a subcortical location (95% in the tibia or fibula).

Benign osteofibrous dysplasia may be a precursor of adamantinoma or a regressive phase of adamantinoma.

Histologically, islands of epithelial cells are found in a fibrous stroma. The tumor is typically well-demarcated, osteolytic and eccentric, with cystic zones resembling soap bubbles.

== Diagnosis ==
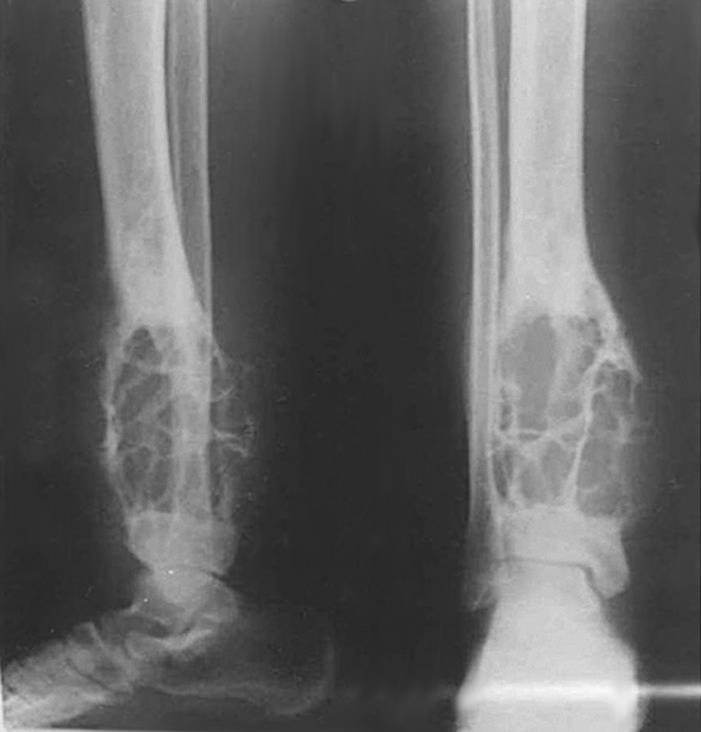
Radiograph showing an adamantinoma in the distal tibia with lytic expansive changes.

X-rays of the affected area show a well defined tumour in bone, with multiple lobules giving a "soap bubble" appearance. MRI can provide a more useful guide to its severity.

== Treatment ==
Treatment consists of wide resection or amputation. Metastases are rare at presentation but may occur in up to 30% of patients during the disease course. Prognosis is excellent, with overall survival of 85% at 10 years, but is lower when wide surgical margins cannot be obtained. This tumor is insensitive to radiation so chemotherapy is not typically used unless the cancer has metastasized to the lungs or other organs.

== History ==
The typically benign odontogenic tumor known as ameloblastoma was first recognized in 1827 by Cusack. Still, it did not yet have any designation. In 1885, this kind of odontogenic neoplasm was designated as an adamantinoma by Malassez. It was finally renamed to the modern name ameloblastoma in 1930 by Ivey and Churchill.
