= Juvenile hyaline fibromatosis =

- Other names: Puretic syndrome
- Autosomal recessive pattern is the inheritance manner of this condition
- Specialty: Dermatology

Juvenile hyaline fibromatosis (also known as fibromatosis hyalinica multiplex juvenilis and Murray–Puretic–Drescher syndrome) is a very rare, autosomal recessive disease due to mutations in capillary morphogenesis protein-2 (CMG-2 gene). It occurs from early childhood to adulthood, and presents as slow-growing, pearly white or skin-colored dermal or subcutaneous papules or nodules on the face, scalp, and back, which may be confused clinically with neurofibromatosis. The World Health Organization in 2020 reclassified the papules and nodules that occur in juvenile hyaline fibromatosis as one of the specific benign types of tumors in the category of fibroblastic and myofibroblastic tumors.

== Presentation ==
This condition is characterised by abnormal growth of hyalinized fibrous tissue with cutaneous, mucosal, osteoarticular and systemic involvement.

Clinical features include extreme pain at minimal handling in a newborn, gingival hypertrophy, subcutaneous nodules, painful joint stiffness and contractures, muscle weakness and hypotonia.

== Genetics ==
This condition is due to mutations in the anthrax toxin receptor-2 (ANTXR2) gene. This gene is also known as capillary morphogenesis protein-2.

This gene is located on the long arm of chromosome 4 (4q21.21).

== Management ==
There is no presently known curative treatment for this condition.

Management is supportive.

== Prognosis ==
Prognosis is very poor with a median age at death of 15 months.

== Epidemiology ==
84 cases have been reported as of 2018.

== Notable individuals ==
Argentinian Matías Fernández Burzaco, aged 23, published a book about his experience of the condition, “Formas Propias”. He has also performed as a rap artist.

== See also ==
- List of cutaneous conditions
