= Jaffe–Campanacci syndrome =

- Other names: Multiple non-ossifying fibromatosis
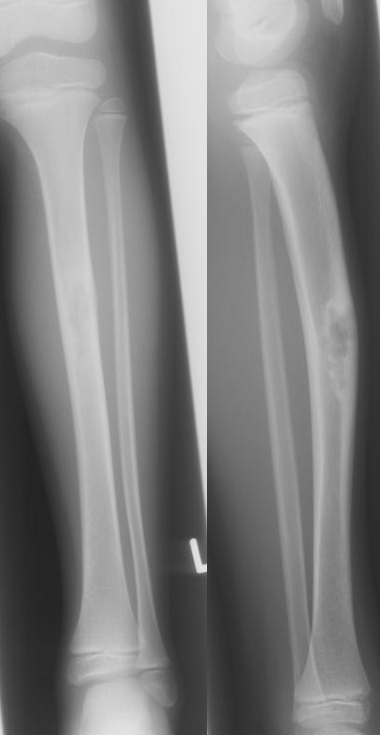
- Jaffe-Campanacci-Syndrome, boy 7 Y, tibial bowing and cortical/subcortial mixed sclerosis
- Specialty: Medical genetics

Jaffe–Campanacci syndrome is one of the disorders associated with café au lait macules (CALMs). Presentations may include intellectual disability, disseminated non-ossifying fibromas of the long bones and jaw, hypogonadism or cryptorchidism, or giant cell granulomas of the jaw.

It was characterized in 1958 and 1983.

== See also ==
- List of cutaneous conditions
