= Congenital hypertrophy of the lateral fold of the hallux =

- Specialty: Dermatology

Congenital hypertrophy of the lateral fold of the hallux is a rare cutaneous condition of unknown pathology that present to newborns. The condition was "first described by Martinet et al. in 1984." This sometimes painful condition involves "an overgrowth of the soft tissue" that can partially cover the nail plate. The condition usually effects both extremities and the condition can later reverse spontaneously.

== See also ==
- List of cutaneous conditions
