= Squamous cell papilloma =

- Other names: Squamous papilloma
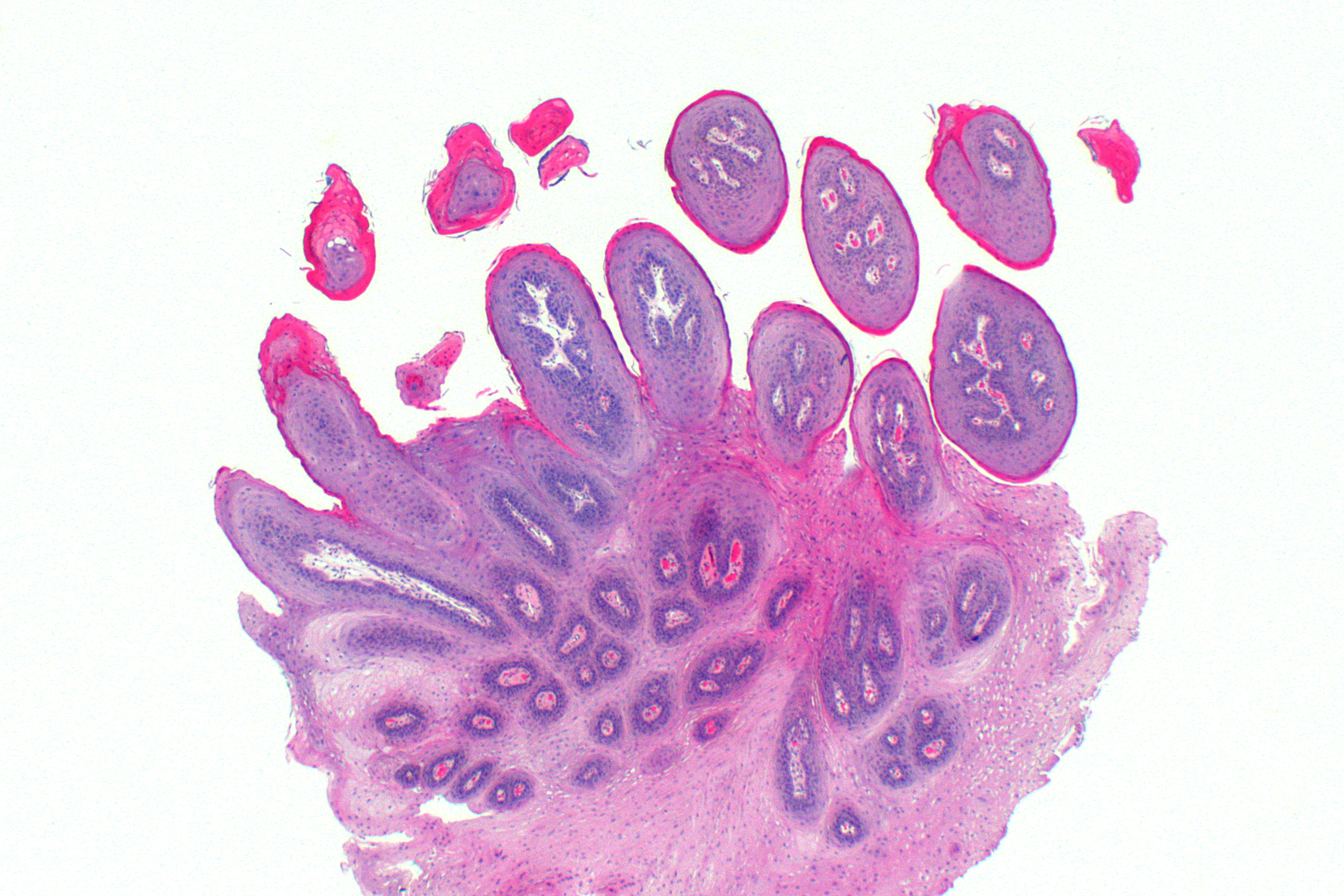
- Micrograph showing a squamous papilloma of the tongue. H&E stain.
- Specialty: Oncology

A squamous cell papilloma is a generally benign papilloma that arises from the stratified squamous epithelium of the skin, lip, oral cavity, tongue, pharynx, larynx, esophagus, cervix, vagina or anal canal. Squamous cell papillomas are typically associated with human papillomavirus (HPV) while sometimes the cause is unknown.

== Types ==
=== Oral squamous cell papilloma ===
Squamous cell papilloma of the mouth or throat is generally diagnosed in people between the ages of 30 and 50, and is normally found on the inside of the cheek, on the tongue, or inside of lips. Oral papillomas are usually painless and not treated unless they interfere with eating or cause pain. They do not generally mutate to cancerous growths, nor do they normally grow or spread. Oral papillomas are usually a result of the infection with types HPV-6 and HPV-11.

=== Conjunctival squamous cell papilloma ===
Normally found in children or young adults, a common cause of conjunctival squamous cell papilloma is during childbirth, when the mother passes the virus to her child.

== Diagnosis ==
It appears as an exophytic mass with a cauliflower-like appearance. The lesion may be white, red, or normal in color. It appears as a sessile or pedunculated mass. Histopathology typically shows papillomatosis protrusions and/or dysplasia.

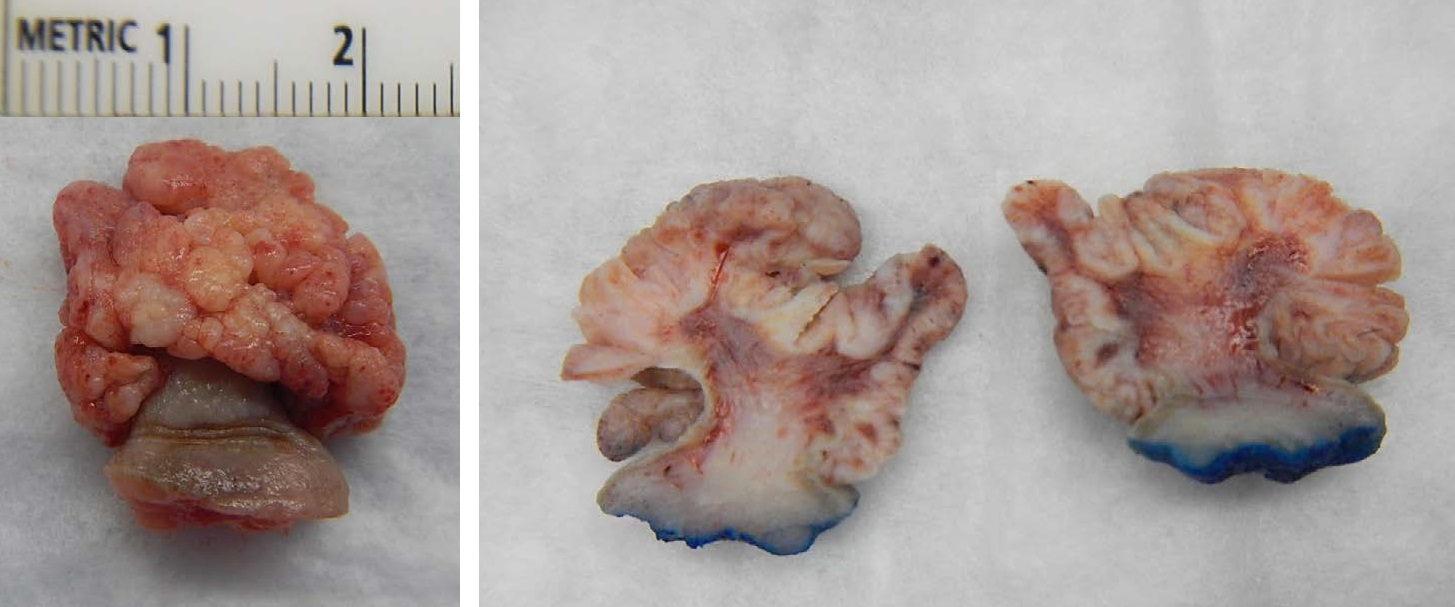
Gross pathology of a large squamous cell papilloma

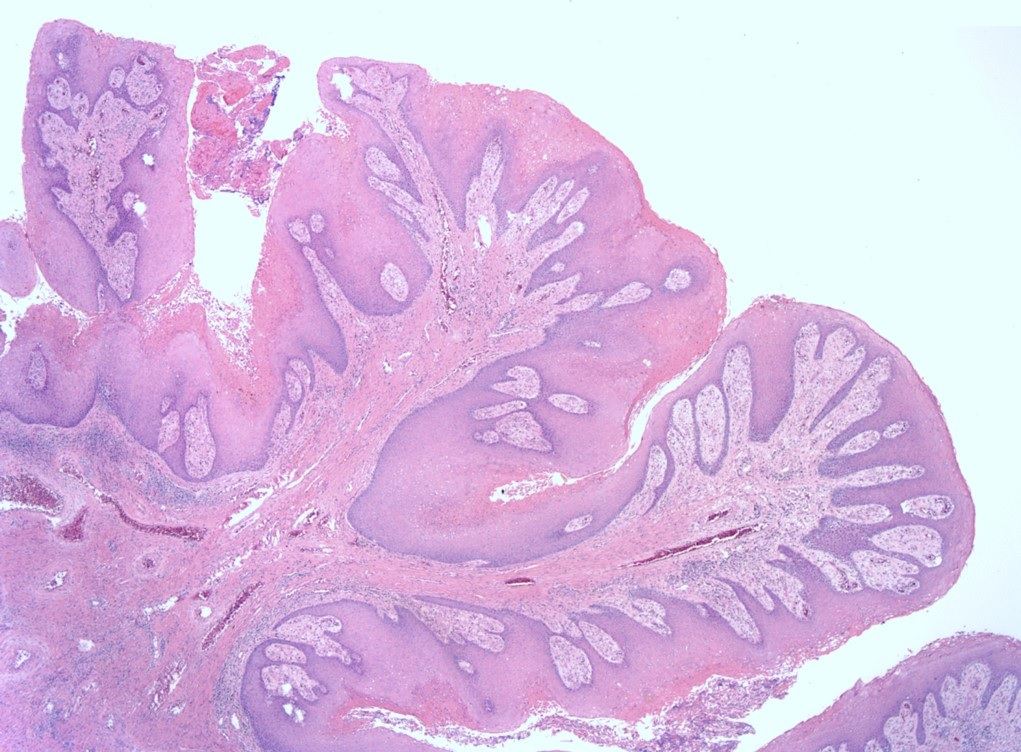
Histopathology of the same papilloma.

== Treatment ==
While most cases require no treatment, therapy options include cryotherapy, application of a topical salicylic acid compound, surgical excision and laser ablation.
