= Epidemiology of periodontal diseases =

Epidemiology of periodontal disease is the study of patterns, causes, and effects of periodontal diseases. Periodontal disease is a disease affecting the tissue surrounding the teeth. This causes the gums and the teeth to separate making spaces that become infected. The immune system tries to fight the toxins breaking down the bone and tissue connecting to the teeth to the gums. The teeth will have to be removed. This is an advance stage of gum disease that has multiple definitions. Adult periodontitis affects less than 10 to 15% of the population in industrialized countries, mainly adults around the ages of 50 to 60. The disease is now declining world-wide.

== Prevalence of periodontal diseases in adults ==
Many studies look at the prevalence of “advanced periodontitis”, but have differing definitions of this term. Generally though, severe forms of periodontitis do not seem to affect more than 15% of the population of industrialized countries. The proportion of such subjects increases with age and seems to peak between 50 and 60 years. A later decline in prevalence may be due to tooth loss.

There are a number of methodological concerns with prevalence studies, particularly 1) the ability of partial recording to reflect full-mouth conditions and 2) the use of the Community periodontal index of treatment needs (CPITN) recording system.

The performance of a partial recording system is affected by the actual prevalence of periodontal disease in the population in question. The less frequent the disease, the more difficult it becomes for a partial recording system to detect it and thus may lead to greater underestimation of the disease prevalence. A full-mouth examination remains the best method of accurately assessing the prevalence and severity of periodontal disease in a population.

The use of the CPITN system for epidemiological purposes has flaws, which are grounded in a number of historical truths. At the time the system was designed, the initiation of periodontal disease was thought to develop from a continuum from an inflammation-free state to gingivitis, to calculus deposition and pocket formation and then to progressive disease. Treatment concepts were based on the concept of pocket depths being the most critical criterion for surgical versus non-surgical treatments. This index was also designed to screen large populations to determine treatment needs and formulate preventive strategies, not to describe the prevalence and severity of periodontal diseases.

Albandar (1999) reported on data from the Third National Health and Nutrition Examination Survey (NHANES III). This was derived from a large nationally representative, stratified, multistage probability sample in the USA comprising 9689 subjects. Pockets > 5mm were found in 7.6% of non-Hispanic white subjects, 18.4% of non-Hispanic black subjects and 14.4% in Mexican Americans; a total of 8.9% of all subjects had pockets > 5mm. Attachment loss > 5mm was found in 19.9% of non-Hispanic white subjects, 27.9% of non-Hispanic black subjects and 28.3% of Mexican Americans; a total of 19.9% of all subjects had attachment loss > 5mm. This suggests that severe periodontitis in not uniformly distributed among various races, ethnicities and socioeconomic groups.

Hugoson (1998) examined three random samples of 600, 597 and 584 subjects in 1973, 1983 and 1993 respectively. These subjects were aged 20–70 years. The severity of disease was divided into five groups, with group 5 having the most severe disease. There was an apparent increase from 1% to 2% to 3% over the three study periods, which may have been due to an increase of dentate subjects in the older age groups.

Susin 2004 examined a representative sample of 853 dentate individuals in Brazil who were selected by a multistage probability sampling method. They had a full-mouth clinical examination of six sites per tooth and answered a structured written questionnaire. Seventy-nine percent (79%) and 52% of the subjects and 36% and 16% of the teeth per subject had CAL >5 and >7mm, respectively.

Oliver 1998

Bourgeois 2007 found that the prevalence of deep pockets (> 5mm) is low (10.21%) in a cross-sectional study.

Baelum 1996 recalculated their previous data from Kenyan and Chinese populations to conform to the methods of examination and data presentation utilized in six other surveys. They did not find that the data supported the traditional generalization that prevalence and severity of periodontitis is markedly increased in African and Asian populations.

Eke et al. provided an update of prevalence of periodontitis from their 2015 report summarizing data from the National Health and Nutrition Examination Survey (NHANES) 2009 to 2012. Report showed that 46% (64.7 million people) of the US adult population had periodontitis. Prevalence was highest in Hispanics (63.5%) and non-Hispanic blacks (59.1%), followed by non-Hispanic Asian Americans (50.0%) and non-Hispanic whites (40.8%).

== Incidence of periodontitis ==
Like measurements of prevalence of periodontitis, the measurement of incidence will vary depending upon the case definition of the disease. Often “incidence” refers to new sites that meet the definition of periodontitis, even if they occur within a person that already has other diseased sites.

Beck 1997 found that past disease predicted subsequent CAL, although not usually at the same site. Also, persons with greater attachment loss at baseline were more likely to lose teeth over the next 5 years.

Beck 1997 – looked at incidence density such that the numerator was attachment loss greater or equal to 3mm while the denominator was the time at risk for each site. The incident density for all subjects was 0.0017 per site per month. In other words, if 1000 sites were followed for one month, 1.7 sites would lose 3mm or greater attachment. In one year, 20.6 sites would be expected to show this degree of loss. - blacks has twice the incidence density of whites; males > females.

Gilbert 2005 describes a prospective study of persons in Florida > 45 years old. In-person interviews and examinations were conducted at baseline and 48 months. The study size was 560 persons and at the 48-month examination, 22% of persons and 1.8% of teeth had attachment loss incidence.

== Early onset periodontitis ==
Albandar 2002 examined 690 school attendees aged 12–25 years. They found that 2.3% had generalized EOP and 4.2% had localized EOP. This total of 6.5% contrasted with 1.8% for Nigeria, 3.1–3.7% for Brazil, 6.8% in India and 8% in Sudan. The prevalence in Caucasian populations is in the 0.1% to 0.2% range and may indicate that subjects originating from the sub-Saharan countries of Africa may be at higher risk of developing EOP.

Tinoco 1997 examined 7843 children between the ages of 12 and 19 in Brazil with strict clinical and radiographic criteria. A 0.3% prevalence of localized juvenile periodontitis was found, with different subpopulations exhibiting a range between 0.1% and 1.1%. This study found that LJP was highly associated with Actinobacillus actinomycetemcomitans.

Lopez 2001 examined 9,162 high school children for clinical attachment loss in 6 sites of first and second molars and incisors. Overall, CAL >1mm was seen in 69.2% of the students; >2mm in 16% of the students and >3mm in 4.5%. They noted that while the distribution of CAL was markedly skewed, it followed a continuum of disease severity. No sharp distinction exists between periodontal health and disease among Chilean adolescents.

Levin 2006 studied 642 young Israeli army recruits (562 men and 80 women) – clinical periodontal examination of four first molars and eight incisors and radiographs were completed. Aggressive periodontitis was found in 5.9% of the subjects (4.3% localized and 1.6% generalized). This was significantly associated with current smoking and ethnic origin (North African).

Eres 2009 examined 3,056 students between the ages of 13 and 19 years at public schools in Turkey. Their mouths were coded according to the recommendations of the CPITN (Community Periodontal Index of Treatment Needs). Among the 3,056 students screened, 170 were scheduled for further examination and 18 were diagnosed with localized aggressive periodontitis. Thus, the prevalence of LAgP was 0.6% with a female to male ratio of 1.25:1.

== Tooth loss ==
Baelum 1997 reported on the incidence of tooth loss over 10 years among adult and elderly Chinese and looked at some predictive factors. There were 440 subjects, 8 of which were edentulous at baseline and 31 who lost all remaining teeth during the study period. Of the 401 who remained dentate, the incidence of tooth loss ranged from 45% in the 20- to 29-year-old group to 96% in the 60 years plus group. He found that the best baseline predictors of tooth loss of all remaining teeth was that at least one tooth had attachment loss greater or equal to 7mm. As in other studies, a major portion of the total number of teeth lost was accounted for by a small group of persons. In this study, dental caries was the dominant reason for tooth loss.
