= Central odontogenic fibroma =

Rare benign odontogenic tumor

Central odontogenic fibroma (COF) is a rare benign mesenchymal odontogenic tumor that arises from ectomesenchymal components of tooth-forming tissues, most commonly associated with periodontal ligament–related structures within the jawbones. Ectomesenchyme refers to embryonic connective tissue derived from neural crest cells, which contributes to the formation of head & neck structures, including bone, cartilage, and dental tissues.

Clinically, COF usually manifests as a slow-growing and asymptomatic swelling, though progressive enlargement may lead to jaw expansion or displacement of adjacent teeth. Radiographically, COF most commonly appears as a well-defined unilocular radiolucent lesion, although multilocular radiolucencies or mixed radiolucent–radiopaque patterns may also be observed. Histologically, the tumor is characterized by fibrous connective tissue containing variable amounts of inactive odontogenic epithelial rests, with stromal features ranging from myxoid to densely collagenized connective tissue. Historically, COF was classified into epithelium-rich (complex or WHO type) and epithelium-poor (simple type) variants, depending on the amount of odontogenic epithelium present. The 2022 World Health Organization (WHO) classification further recognizes additional histopathologic variants, including amyloid, granular cell, ossifying, and hybrid forms associated with central giant cell granuloma. Although generally benign and slow-growing, untreated lesions may lead to complications such as tooth displacement, cortical bone destruction, and, in rare cases, significant functional impairment, highlighting the importance of early diagnosis and appropriate management.

== Epidemiology ==
COF accounts for approximately 0.3–2.8% of odontogenic tumors and less than 1.5% of odontogenic neoplasms, making it an uncommon lesion in clinical practice. It can occur in both the maxilla and mandible, with relatively similar distribution between the two jaws, although the anterior maxilla and the premolar–molar region of the mandible are reported as common sites. The tumor most frequently presents in the second and third decades of life and shows a slight female predilection.

== Signs and symptoms of central odontogenic fibroma ==
Central Odontogenic fibroma (COF) occurs slightly more often in the mandible (53%) than in the maxilla (47%). In the mandible, it most commonly affects the posterior molar region, followed by the premolar area, while in the maxilla, it is most frequently found in the premolar region, then the anterior (incisor–canine) region, and least commonly in the molar area [Fig 1].

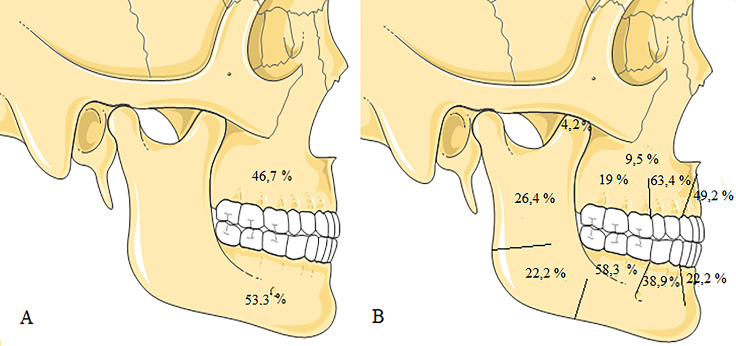
Figure 1: Figure 1: Distribution of locations of central odontogenic fibroma. (A) According to the involved jaw (maxilla or mandible). (B) According to the site involved within the maxilla or mandible. The sum of these percentages is higher than 100% because a lesion can be located in several sites.

Clinically, COF is detected through symptoms in about 47% of cases, while around 23% are discovered incidentally on radiographs. The most common presentation is a painless, slow-growing swelling that may cause facial asymmetry. Pain is uncommon, and other features such as tooth mobility, trismus, tooth displacement, or delayed eruption are rare.

Extraoral signs are usually absent, but when present, they mainly involve facial asymmetry, with very rare occurrences of lymphadenopathy, trismus, or paraesthesia [Table 1]. Intraorally, COF typically presents as a mucosal swelling of variable appearance [Table 2], most often as a slowly enlarging mass. Less commonly, there may be palatal depression, mucosal perforation, or erythematous changes.

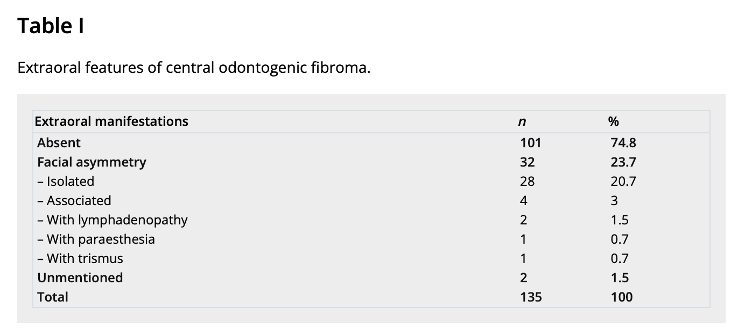
Table 1: Extraoral features of central odontogenic fibroma

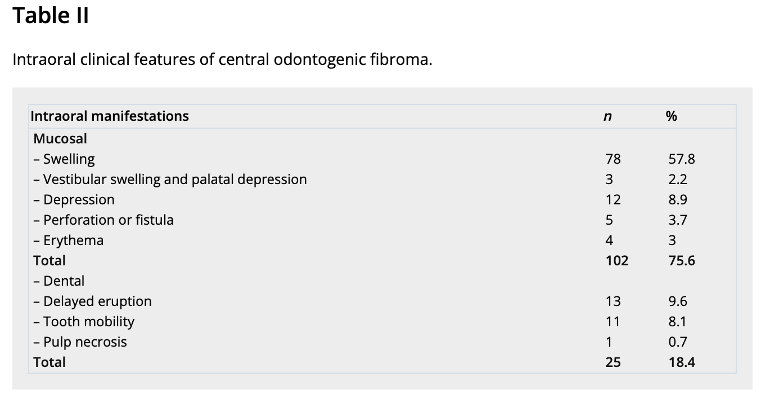
Table 2: Intraoral clinical features of central odontogenic fibroma

== Pathogenesis ==
The pathogenesis of central odontogenic fibroma (COF) is unclear due to the rarity of the tumour and the limited number of reported cases. COF represents approximately 0.3–2.8% of odontogenic tumours, and only 0.02–0.03% or oral specimens in large pathology series, which contributes to the limited understanding of its biological behaviour.

In some cases, COF occurs in association with lesions resembling central giant-cell granuloma (CGCG), forming a hybrid lesion. There are several proposed hypotheses that explain this relationship. One theory suggests a "collision tumour", where COF and CGCG arise independently but occur simultaneously in the same location. Another proposes that growth factors and cytokines produced by a primary CGCG stimulate the proliferation of odontogenic tissue, leading to the development of COF. A third hypothesis suggests that COF is the primary lesion, which then induces a reactive giant-cell granuloma-like response following trauma or other stimuli.

Hybrid lesions containing a giant-cell granuloma-like component appear to show higher recurrence rates than conventional COF, suggesting that this component may influence tumour behaviour.

== Diagnosis ==
Diagnosis of odontogenic fibroma relies on clinical, radiologic, and pathological correlation. According to the criteria proposed by Wesley et al. in 1975, the lesion typically presents clinically as a central jaw tumor that grows slowly and causes painless cortical expansion.

Radiographically, it often appears as a multilocular radiolucent lesion similar to ameloblastoma or odontogenic myxoma, and in later stages may involve large areas of the jaw or be associated with unerupted or displaced teeth.

Histopathologically, the tumor is characterized by mature collagen fibers with many fibroblasts, sometimes accompanied by small nests or strands of inactive odontogenic epithelium. Odontogenic fibroma is benign and generally responds well to surgical enucleation, with no tendency for malignant transformation.

== Differential diagnosis ==
The differential diagnosis of central odontogenic fibroma (COF) includes several odontogenic and non-odontogenic lesions with overlapping clinical and radiographic features. COF may present as a radiolucent or mixed radiolucent–radiopaque lesion of the jaws and may cause cortical expansion, tooth displacement, or bone destruction, which can resemble other benign or malignant jaw tumors.

Lesions that may be considered in the differential diagnosis include osteosarcoma, fibrosarcoma, odontogenic myxoma, and other fibro-osseous or odontogenic tumors. In some cases, aggressive radiographic features such as cortical destruction or a "sunburst" pattern may initially raise suspicion of malignant tumors such as osteosarcoma before histological evaluation confirms COF.

Additional odontogenic lesions that may mimic COF include ameloblastoma, ameloblastic fibroma, desmoplastic fibroma, and calcifying odontogenic cysts, as well as follicular (dentigerous) cysts and other radiolucent jaw lesions. Because these conditions may appear similar on clinical examination and imaging, definitive diagnosis requires histopathological analysis demonstrating fibrous connective tissue with scattered odontogenic epithelial rests, a characteristic feature of COF.

== Histology ==
Histologically, the simple type is characterized by a tumor mass made up of mature collagen fibers interspersed with many plump fibroblasts that are very uniform in their placement and tend to be equidistant from each other. Small nests or islands of odontogenic epithelium that appear entirely inactive are present in variable but usually in quite minimal amounts. The WHO type also consists of relatively mature but quite cellular fibrous connective tissue with few to many islands of odontogenic epithelium. Osteoid, dysplastic dentin or cementum-like material is also variably present.

== Radiographic features ==
The radiographic appearance of central odontogenic fibroma is variable. Most lesions appear as well-defined unilocular radiolucencies, although multilocular radiolucent patterns may also occur.

A systematic review found that unilocular radiolucencies accounted for approximately 54% of cases, while multilocular lesions represented about 24%. Although many lesions are entirely radiolucent, some may contain internal calcifications, resulting in a mixed radiolucent-radiopaque appearance.

Additionally, radiographic findings reported in some cases include tooth displacement, root resorption, cortical bone thinning or perforation, and expansion of the jaw.

COF may be associated with teeth in different ways, including lesions that are root-associated, apex associated, interradicular, or located in edentulous areas.

Because these radiographic features overlap with those of other jaw lesions, imaging alone is insufficient for definitive diagnosis, and histopathological examination is usually required to confirm the diagnosis.

== Treatment and management ==
The primary treatment for cemento-ossifying fibroma (COF) is surgical enucleation, performed in about 66% of cases, where the lesion is removed in one piece. Other conservative approaches include curettage (14%), where the lesion is removed in fragments, and rarely non-interruptive resection (1.5%). More aggressive treatment, such as interruptive mandibulectomy, is uncommon (4.4%) and reserved for severe cases. In rare situations (0.7%), no treatment is provided due to factors like advanced age and non-aggressive lesions. Additional procedures may be required, including tooth extraction (19.3%) to gain access or due to non-restorable teeth, and less commonly endodontic treatment (3%), often combined with apical surgery.

== Prognosis and follow-up ==
The prognosis for Central Odontogenic Fibroma (COF) is excellent following conservative surgical management. Unlike the Odontogenic Keratocyst (OKC), which has a high recurrence rate due to its thin, friable lining and "daughter cysts," the COF is a solid, non-infiltrative mass that is easily separated from the bony walls.

Recurrence is rare, typically occurring only if the lesion is incompletely excised. Long-term studies indicate a recurrence rate of less than 5%. Most patients show complete bony regeneration within 12–24 months. Clinical and radiographic follow-up is recommended at 6 months and 1 year post-operatively, with subsequent annual check-ups for at least 5 years to ensure no late-stage recurrence.

== Molecular and genetic findings ==
Research on the molecular and genetic characteristics of central odontogenic fibroma is limited because the tumor is rare. Most available studies focus on immunohistochemistry, a laboratory technique used to identify proteins in cells, rather than detailed genetic sequencing. Studies have shown that the epithelial (cell) component of the tumor commonly expresses several cytokeratin proteins, including CKAE1/AE3, CK5, CK14, and CK19, which support its origin from odontogenic (tooth-forming) tissues. Immune cells known as Langerhans cells may also be present within the epithelial islands and can be identified by markers such as S-100 and CD1a.

The connective tissue (stromal) component of the tumor usually shows markers such as vimentin and sometimes smooth muscle actin, suggesting that the tumor contains fibroblast-like cells that form fibrous tissue. Studies examining cell growth have found that the Ki-67 proliferation index, which measures how quickly cells divide, is typically very low (often less than 1%). This finding is consistent with the slow growth and benign behavior of central odontogenic fibroma. Some cases have also shown the presence of CD99, a protein found in both epithelial and stromal cells. In addition, small deposits of proteins related to the basement membrane, including collagen type IV, have been observed within epithelial cell clusters. Rare variants of the tumor may also contain amyloid-like protein deposits, which are abnormal protein accumulations sometimes seen in odontogenic tumors. Overall, these findings support the view that central odontogenic fibroma is a tumor made up of odontogenic epithelial cells and fibrous connective tissue, although its exact molecular mechanisms are still not fully understood.

== Case reports and variants ==
While most COFs are asymptomatic and intraosseous, rare presentations provide significant diagnostic challenges:

- Hybrid Lesions: Several case reports describe a "hybrid" lesion consisting of COF and Central Giant Cell Granuloma (CGCG). These cases often show more aggressive clinical behavior, including cortical perforation and rapid expansion.
- Giant COF: Rare reports highlight "giant" variants (exceeding 6 cm) that cause significant facial asymmetry and displacement of the inferior alveolar nerve.
- The WHO-Type Variant: This histological variant contains a high density of odontogenic epithelium and calcified material. Case reports suggest this type may be more common in the maxilla and can occasionally be mistaken for a cemento-ossifying fibroma.
- Amyloid Deposits: A rare variant has been reported where amyloid-like material is found within the fibrous stroma, requiring Congo Red staining for definitive diagnosis.
