= Peripheral giant-cell granuloma =

- Specialty: Dentistry, ENT surgery

Peripheral giant-cell granuloma (PGCG) is an oral pathologic condition that appears in the mouth as an overgrowth of tissue due to irritation or trauma. Because of its overwhelming incidence on the gingiva, the condition is associated with two other diseases, pyogenic granuloma and peripheral ossifying fibroma. These three diseases are associated because they appear frequently on gingiva. Due to its similar microscopic appearance, peripheral giant-cell granuloma is considered to be the soft tissue equivalent of central giant-cell granuloma.

The appearance of peripheral giant-cell granuloma is also similar to pyogenic granuloma. The color ranges from red to bluish-purple, but is usually more blue in comparison to pyogenic granuloma. It can be sessile or pedunculated with the size usually being less than 2 cm.

The lesion has a 60% gender predilection to females. The prevalence of the peripheral giant-cell granuloma is highest around 50 - 60 years of age. It appears only on the gingiva or on an edentulous alveolar ridge. It is more often found in the mandible rather than the maxilla, in either anterior or posterior areas. The underlying alveolar bone can be destroyed, leaving a unique appearance referred to as "cupping resorption" or "saucerization".

== Diagnosis ==
Peripheral giant-cell granuloma appears microscopically as a large number of multinucleated giant cells, which can have up to dozens of nuclei. Additionally, there are mesenchymal cells that are ovoid and spindle-shaped. Near the borders of the lesion, deposits of hemosiderin and hemorrhage is often found. In 50% of cases, ulcerations are present.

== Treatment ==
Treatment usually involves surgical removal of the lesion down to the bone. If there are any adjacent teeth, they are cleaned thoroughly by scaling and root planing (SRP) to remove any possible source of irritation. Recurrence is around 10%.

== See also ==
- Central giant-cell granuloma
