= Urothelial papilloma =

A urothelial papilloma is a rare, noncancerous tumor found within the urinary tract.

== Clinical Presentation ==
The most common presenting symptom is hematuria (blood in urine). The average age at which it occurs is 46 years old.

== Morphology and Histology ==
The tumor is made of a fibrovascular core covered by seemingly normal urothelium tissue. Under microscope, papillary (finger-like) fronds can be seen that feature occasional branching, but no fusion.

== Genetic Associations ==
The tumors are diploid (contain two sets of chromosomes). They commonly show FGFR3 mutations.
