= Epulis =

Tumor of the gums

- Specialty: Oral surgery

Epulis (Greek: ἐπουλίς; plural epulides) is any tumor-like enlargement (i.e. lump) situated on the gingival or alveolar mucosa. The word literally means "(growth) on the gingiva", and describes only the location of the mass and has no further implications on the nature of the lesion. There are three types: fibromatous, ossifying and acanthomatous. The related term parulis (commonly called a gumboil) refers to a mass of inflamed granulation tissue at the opening of a draining sinus on the alveolus over (or near to) the root of an infected tooth. Another closely related term is gingival enlargement, which tends to be used where the enlargement is more generalized over the whole gingiva rather than a localized mass.

== Epulis fissuratum ==
This is a fibrous hyperplasia of excess connective tissue folds that takes place in reaction to chronic trauma from an ill fitting denture. It usually occurs in the mandibular labial sulcus. The clinical appearance of these lesions can vary, from erythematous mucosa that is prone to bleeding (a manifestation of hyperaemia), to lesions of more dense connective tissue, appearing more pale and firm. Sometimes the term epulis is used synonymously with epulis fissuratum, but this is technically incorrect as several other lesions could be described as epulides.

This condition typically affects middle-aged and elderly patients. It is causes when a denture irritates the mucosa forming an ulcer. In time, this ulcer may develop into an elongated fibro-epithelial enlargement. Several leaflets may develop.

Management of this condition includes trimming the denture flange or areas causing irritation to the mucosa. Should modification of the denture not cause the lesion to decrease in size after 2–3 weeks, the swelling should be biopsied and examined histologically.

== Pyogenic granuloma ==
This type of epulis is neither pyogenic ("pus producing") nor a true granuloma, but it is a vascular lesion. About 75% of all pyogenic granulomas occur on the gingiva, growing beneath the gingival margin, although they may also occur elsewhere in the mouth or other parts of the body (where the term epulis is inappropriate). This common oral lesion is thought to be a reaction to recurrent trauma or a response to non-specific infection. It is more common in younger people and in females, and appears as a red-purple nodular swelling and bleeds easily. Small lesions can vary from a few millimetres up to two or three centimetres. Larger lesions can be attached to the gingiva with or without a stalk. This type of epulis may also penetrate interdentally and present as bilobular, i.e. present both buccally and lingually.

== Pregnancy epulis ==
Also termed a "pregnancy tumor" or "granuloma gravidarum", this lesion is identical to a pyogenic granuloma in all respects apart from the fact that it occurs exclusively in pregnant females. Hormonal changes during pregnancy causes an increased inflammatory response to plaque and other irritants, which in turn causes the development of the epulis. There is usually pregnancy gingivitis also. Pregnancy epulis commonly occurs during the third trimester of pregnancy.

== Fibrous epulis ==
In adults, this type of epulis is characterised as a firm, pink mass that is not inflamed. It seems to grow from below the free gingival margin/interdental papilla. This epulis most commonly occurs on the gingiva near the front of the mouth between two teeth. When gingival hyperplasia is confined to one area of the jaw, this is when it is termed an epulis fibrosa, caused by an increase in collagenous tissue with varying cellularity. It may be sessile or pedunculated and is composed of fibrosed granulation tissue. Fibrous epulides are firm and rubbery, and pale pink in color. Over time, bone may form within the lesion at which point the term peripheral ossifying fibroma may be used (in some parts of the world), despite having no relation to the ossifying fibroma of bone and it is not a fibroma. This type of epulis is most often painless, but pain may be associated due to secondary trauma, via brushing, flossing or chewing. Diagnosis of a fibrous epulis is based firstly upon clinical features. A variety of common presentations exist including: painless, round and pedunculated swellings, rarely exceeding 2 cm in diameter, swelling sometimes next to areas of irritation, rarely involve attached gingiva and they can be red or pale. The diagnosis is confirmed by an excisional biopsy.

== Ossifying fibroid epulis ==
Not to be confused with ossifying fibroma. This is a long-standing fibrous epulis in which bone has begun to form. It is believed that irritants and trauma cause the growth. Dental appliances, poor restorations and subgingival plaque and calculus are all examples of possible causes. It is seen most commonly in young adults and teenagers but can occur at any age, with the majority of cases occurring in females. In a clinical point of view, they are sessile or pedunculated, typically ulcerated and erythematous or are similar to the surrounding gingiva in colour. they are usually <2 cm in size. Ossifying fibroid epulis should be excised and examined make a definitive diagnosis. However, recurrences are common.

== Giant cell epulis ==
This epulis contains giant cells and is usually found on the gum margin between teeth which are anterior to the permanent molars. The development of a giant cell epulis may be related to the recent loss of baby teeth, extraction or trauma. The swelling is round, soft and commonly maroon or purplish in colour. It is also termed peripheral giant cell granuloma. Children are typically mainly affected, with females being affected more than males

Diagnosis of giant cell epulis usually requires a biopsy and radiographs should be taken of the area.

== Epulis granulomatosa ==
An epulis granulomatosa is a granuloma which grows from an extraction socket (the hole left after a tooth has been removed), and as such can be considered to be a complication of healing after oral surgery.

== Congenital epulis ==
This rare epulis (also called granular cell tumor, congenital gingival granular cell tumor or Neumann's tumor) presents at birth, and is not acquired, in contrast to most other epulides which tend to be reactive lesions to tissue irritation. Congenital epulides mainly affect females and every so often, the growth is so large that it can obstruct breathing and feeding. On rare occasion, it may arise on the tongue, or be multifocal.

Clinically, congenital epuli are usually found on the alveolar ridge, and are typically pink, pedunculated, firm, have a smooth or lobulated surface and the size varies from a few to 9 mm. They are usually found in solitary with multiple growths only in 10% of cases. It is commonly a pedunculated lesion in the incisor region. A diagnoses can usually be made based on clinical findings.

Histologically, congenital epuli are benign and thought to have a mesenchymal origin. When examined, cells with abundant granular eosinophilic and small eccentric nuclei are found. A delicate fibrovascular network can be found between the cells. It has an unusual resemblance to granular cell myoblastoma and is more common in the maxilla than the mandible.

A congenital Epulis can potentially involute, therefore, if it is not interfering with feeding and breathing, monitoring the lesion is advised. Otherwise, the lesion is removed with a simple excision and it does not have a tendency to recur. Diagnosis is typically based upon clinical features but a biopsy confirms this.
