= Retrocuspid papilla =

Retrocuspid papilla (RCP) is a small elevated nodules mostly behind the lower canine teeth in humans(Fig.1,2). It is sometimes associated with reactive arthritis.

== Epidemiology ==
The RCP are first reported in 1947 and 1965. In a Swedish population it was first reported 1994. Among 1150 consecutively examined patients aged 20 –75 years, 10 showed RCP. Among 2000 biopsy cases from 1989 - 1992 in Department of Oral Pathology Lund University, 15 biopsies met the criteria of RCP.

== Clinical appearance ==
The lesions are bilaterally situated in the attached gingiva or close to the border of the mucosa lingual to the two mandibular canines (Fig.1).

Fig.1.Retrucuspid papillae lingual to both lower canines.

However, they could in a few individuals also be seen simultaneously in the molar region and on the lingual side (Fig.2). They were 2–3 mm wide and high and covered with normal mucosa. Their tips were erected or could be folded down, mimicking the entrance of a periodontal abscess, but no duct was present.

Fig.2. Retrocuspid papilla in molar region labial gingiva mimicking a periodontal abscess

Radiographs showed no bone destruction and the depths of the periodontal pockets could not explain the presence of the lesions. They were nonsymptomatic and were not noticed by the patients.

== Histology ==
Fig.3. Hematoxylin Eosin staining of the attached gingiva with a Retrocuspid papilla.

Immunohistochemical staining with FXIIIa antibody disclosed a population of reactive spindle- or stellate-shaped cells in 11 of 15 cases, located in connective tissue papillae and in a few cases also distributed throughout the lesion. The FXIIIa-stained cells appeared together with the frequently observed stellate, "young" occasionally multinucleated fibroblastic cells observed in more than 50% of patients aged 10–69 years. It is likely that FXIIIA-expressing "mucosal dendrocytes" are pathologically involved in some way.

== See also ==
- Nodule
- Canine tooth
