= Peripheral ossifying fibroma =

- Specialty: Dentistry

A peripheral ossifying fibroma, also known as ossifying fibrous epulis, is “a gingival nodule which is composed of a cellular fibroblastic connective tissue stroma which is associated with the formation of randomly dispersed foci of mineralised products, which consists of bone, cementum-like tissue, or a dystrophic calcification. The lesion is considered part of an ossifying fibroma, but that is usually considered to be a jaw tumor. Because of its overwhelming incidence on the gingiva, the condition is associated with two other diseases, though not because they occur together. Instead, the three are associated with each other because they appear frequently on gingiva: pyogenic granuloma and peripheral giant cell granuloma. Some researchers believe peripheral ossifying fibromas to be related to pyogenic fibromas and, in some instances, are the result of a pyogenic granuloma which has undergone fibrosis and calcification.

The term peripheral ossifying fibroma has been criticized as this lesion is not related to the ossifying fibroma of bone and is not a fibroma. This term is used in America, however in Britain, this lesion would be termed a fibrous epulis containing bone.

== Signs and symptoms ==
The color of peripheral ossifying fibromas ranges from red to pink, and is frequently ulcerated. It can be sessile or pedunculated with the size usually being less than 2 cm. Weeks or months may pass by before it is seen and diagnosed.

There is a gender difference with 66% of the disease occurring in females. The prevalence of peripheral ossifying fibromas is highest around 10 – 19 years of age. It appears only on the gingiva, more often on the maxilla rather than the mandible, and is frequently found in the area around incisors and canines. The adjacent teeth are usually not affected.

Peripheral ossifying fibromas appear microscopically as a combination of a mineralized product and fibrous proliferation. The mineralized portion may be bone, cementum-like, or dystrophic calcifications. Additionally, highly developed bone or cementum is more likely to be present when the peripheral ossifying fibroma has existed for a longer period of time.

== Diagnosis ==
Diagnosis is based on clinical assessment and confirmed by histopathology.

== Treatment ==
Treatment usually involves surgical removal of the lesion down to the bone. If there are any adjacent teeth, they are cleaned thoroughly to remove any possible source of irritation. Surgical methods can be traditional, Nd:YAG laser or QMR scalpel. Recurrence is around 16%, with some studies reporting up to 45%. It is unclear if the rate of recurrence is influenced by the surgical technique used.
