= Central giant-cell granuloma =

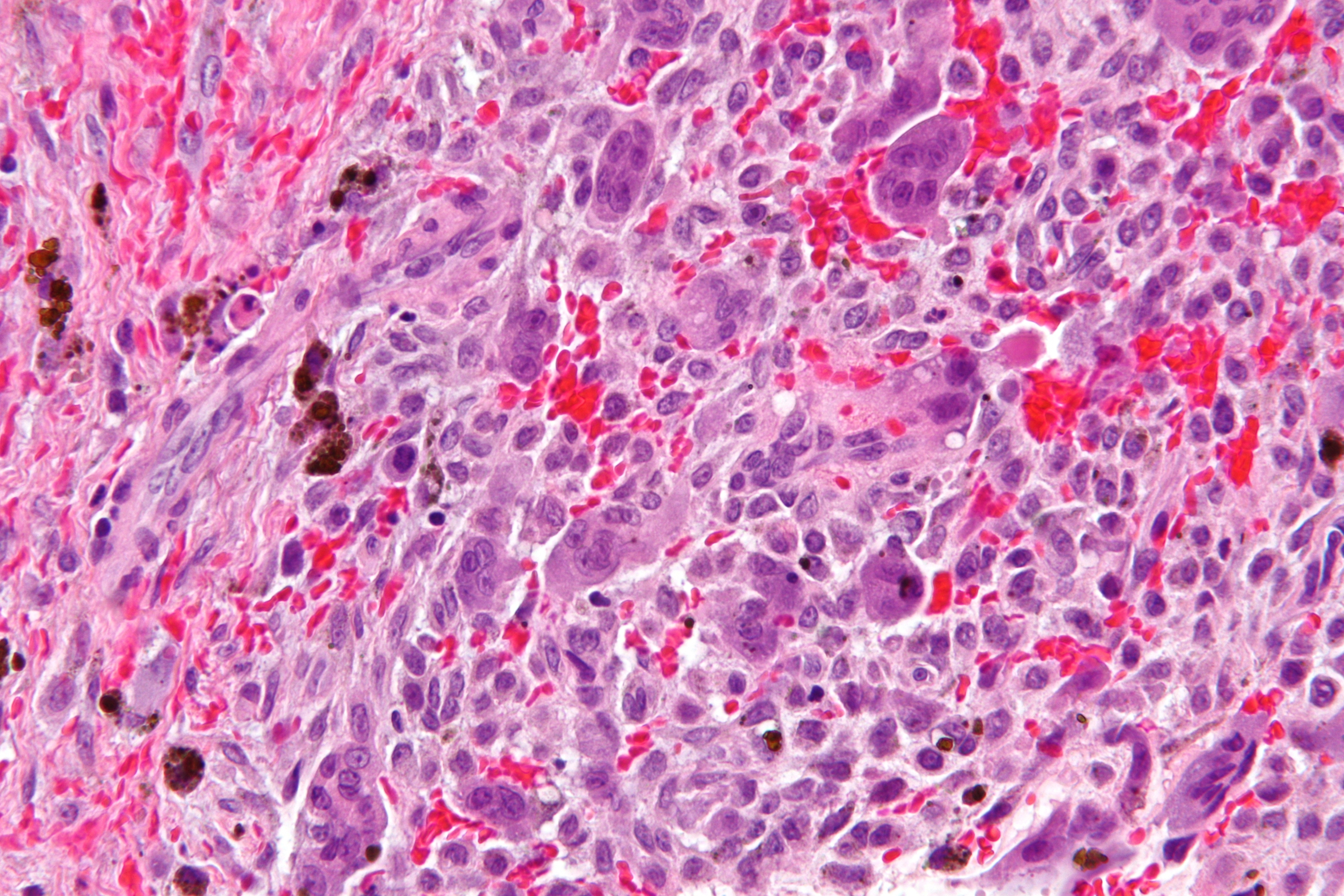
- Micrograph of a central giant cell granuloma showing the characteristic giant cells with surrounding cells that have nuclei that are dissimilar to those in the giant cells. H&E stain.
- Specialty: Oral and Maxillofacial Surgery

Central giant-cell granuloma (CGCG) is a localised benign condition of the jaws. It is twice as common in females and is more likely to occur before age 30. Central giant-cell granulomas are more common in the anterior mandible, often crossing the midline and causing painless swellings.

== Signs and symptoms ==
CGCG is the most common giant cell lesion of the jaws. These lesions are localised fibrous tissue tumours which contain osteoclasts and are usually several centimetres across. Frequently, a painless swelling that grows and expands rapidly is present. This growth can also erode through bone including the alveolar ridge, resulting in a soft tissue swelling that is purple in colour. Paresthesia of the lip has also been observed. Resorption of tooth roots is seen in 37% of cases compared to displacement of teeth in 50%. Two-thirds of lesions are found anterior to molars in the mandible, where teeth have deciduous predecessors.

CGCGs are twice as likely to affect females and usually seen in those under 30-years. However, can be seen in a broad age range.

=== Noonan syndrome ===
Multiple CGCGs can be found in individuals with Noonan syndrome. Mutations in PTPN11 or RAS pathway genes are seen.

== Diagnosis ==
Radiographically, CGCGs have a rounded cyst-like radiolucent area with a well-defined margin with 53% showing scalloped margins. They can have a multilocular (honeycomb or soap bubble) appearance.

Histologically similar to brown tumour found in hyperparathyroidism. Biochemical investigation through serum calcium, to exclude hyperparathyroidism.

=== Histology ===
Unknown pathogenesis.

Histology of CGCG shows a lobulated mass composed of vascular connective tissue and multinucleated giant cells (osteoclasts). The giant cells may be diffusely located throughout the lesion or focally aggregate in the lesion, often clustered around hemorrhagic areas hemosiderin deposits. Lobules of the lesion can be separated by fibrous tissue or even thin layer of bone or osteoid that can be seen radiographically. Giant cells are thought to form in response to signals produced by fibroblasts and blood vessels or as a response to cytokines.

=== Differential diagnosis ===
- Odontogenic keratocyst
- Ameloblastoma
- Odontogenic myxoma
- Hemangioma
- Central odontogenic fibroma
- Brown tumour of hyperparathyroidism
- Cherubism
- Aneurysmal bone cysts

== Treatment ==
The treatment for enlarged CGCG is usually thorough curettage. Recurrence ranges from 15%–20%, second curettage is sufficient to prevent further recurrence. Rapidly growing tumours are more likely to recur and can sometimes require full excision with surrounding bone. Large lesions can require en bloc resections.

Alternatives or adjuncts to surgery:

- Corticosteroids which convert lesions into fibrous tissue
- Calcitonin which slows growth
- Interferon α-2a which slow growth
- Bisphosphonates which slow growth

These therapeutic approaches provide possible alternatives for large lesions which can not go through immediate surgery or in children where facial growth following surgery might be affected. However, no significant differences have been found in the use of surgical and non-surgical methods for treating CGCGs. The long term prognosis of giant-cell granulomas is good and metastases do not develop.

== See also ==
- Peripheral giant-cell granuloma
