= Jones syndrome =

- Other names: Gingival fibromatosis with progressive deafness; GFD; Gingival fibromatosis with sensorineural hearing loss; Familial gingival fibromatosis associated with progressive deafness

Jones syndrome is an extremely rare disorder characterized by gingival fibromatosis and sensorineural hearing loss. The condition is an inherited but the underlying genetic cause is currently unknown.

== Epidemiology ==
Fewer than 100 cases have been published. According to Orphanet, it has been reported in two families.

== Treatment ==
Due to the condition's rarity, there are no treatment guidelines.
