= Acanthoma fissuratum =

- Other names: Granuloma fissuratum, and Spectacle frame acanthoma
- Specialty: Oncology, dermatology

Acanthoma fissuratum, also known as granuloma fissuratum, is a cutaneous condition characterized by local thickening of the skin in response to pressure caused by an eyeglass frame. Acanthoma fissuratum is a hard, folded, flesh-colored lesion or plaque with a central groove. It affects the ear and is common in people wearing poorly fitting spectacle frames. It can also affect other locations like the penis, outer auditory canal, and posterior forchette of the vulva.

== Signs and symptoms ==
In its classic form, it manifests as a single, hard, folded coin-shaped lesion, flesh-colored papule, nodule, or plaque that has a central groove that splits it in half (a look similar to a coffee bean). The retroauricular sulcus, superior auricular sulcus, and the lateral portion of the nose bridge at the inner canthus are common sites for acanthoma fissuratum affecting the ear when it occurs in people wearing poorly fitting spectacle frames. Nonetheless, there have also been reports of involvement at other locations, including the penis, outer auditory canal, and posterior forchette of the vulva.

== Causes ==
The lesions develop as a result of various factors, including improperly fitting eyeglass frames, the weight of the spectacles, concurrent skin diseases, and deformities in the anatomy.

== Diagnosis ==
Acanthosis, hyperkeratosis, and varied parakeratosis are seen in the histopathology. The longitudinal groove, which is matched by central attenuation in the epidermis, may be filled with keratinous debris or inflammatory cells. Variable perivascular nonspecific chronic inflammatory infiltration is seen in the dermis.

== Treatment ==
The mainstay of treatment for acanthoma fissuratum consists of removing the persistently irritating stimuli, which typically causes the lesion to reverse. In severe situations, further techniques like electrosurgery, intralesional corticosteroids, and surgical excision may be employed.

== See also ==
- Seborrheic keratosis
- List of cutaneous conditions
