= Intellectual disability-spasticity-ectrodactyly syndrome =

Intellectual disabilitt-spasticity-ectrodactyly syndrome
- Other names: Jancar syndrome
- Specialty: Medical genetics
- Symptoms: intellectual disabilities, spastic paraplegia, and distal limb defects such as ectrodactyly
- Usual onset: Birth
- Duration: Lifelong
- Causes: Genetic mutation
- Risk factors: Being part of a consanguineous family, being of Middle Eastern descent.
- Prevention: none
- Frequency: 3 families in the Middle East and Europe have been described in medical literature
- Deaths: -

Intellectual disability-spasticity-ectrodactyly syndrome, also known as Jancar syndrome, is a rare autosomal recessive genetic disorder which is characterized by severe intellectual disabilities, hereditary spastic paraplegia, and defects of the distal limbs, such as syndactyly, ectrodactyly, and clinodactyly. Only 3 families in England and Israel have been described in medical literature.
