= Normolipoproteinemic xanthomatosis =

- Specialty: Dermatology

Normolipoproteinemic xanthomatosis is a cutaneous condition characterized by a xanthoma in the presence of normal cholesterol and lipoprotein levels.

== See also ==
- Cerebrotendinous xanthomatosis
- Verruciform xanthoma
- Skin lesion
