= Osteofibrous dysplasia =

- Other names: Ossifying fibroma
- Specialty: Oncology

Osteofibrous dysplasia is a rare, benign non-neoplastic condition with no known cause. It is considered a fibrovascular defect. Campanacci described this condition in two leg bones, the tibia and fibula, and coined the term. This condition should be differentiated from nonossifying fibroma and fibrous dysplasia of bone.

== Presentation ==
The tibia is the most commonly involved bone, accounting for 85% of cases. It is usually painless, although there may be localized pain or fracture, and presents as a localized firm swelling of the tibia in children less than two decades old (median age for males 10, females 13). Several authors have related this non-neoplastic lesion to adamantinoma – a tumor involving subcutaneous long bones – stating the common cause to be fibrovascular defect. However, the latter is distinguished from an osteofibrous dysplasia by the presence of soft tissue extension, intramedullary extension, periosteal reaction and presence of hyperchromic epithelial cells under the microscope.

Osteofibrous dysplasia may also be mistaken for fibrous dysplasia of bone, although osteofibrous dysplasia is more likely to show an immunohistochemical reaction to osteonectin, neurofibromin 1, and S-100 protein.

== Treatment ==
Osteofibrous dysplasia is treated with marginal resection with or without bone grafting, depending on the size of the lesion and the extent of bony involvement. However, due to the high rate of recurrence in skeletally immature individuals, this procedure is usually postponed until skeletal maturity.
