= Irritation fibroma =

Fibroma on oral mucosa

- Other names: Oral fibroma, traumatic fibroma, focal intraoral fibrous hyperplasia, fibrous nodule, oral polyp
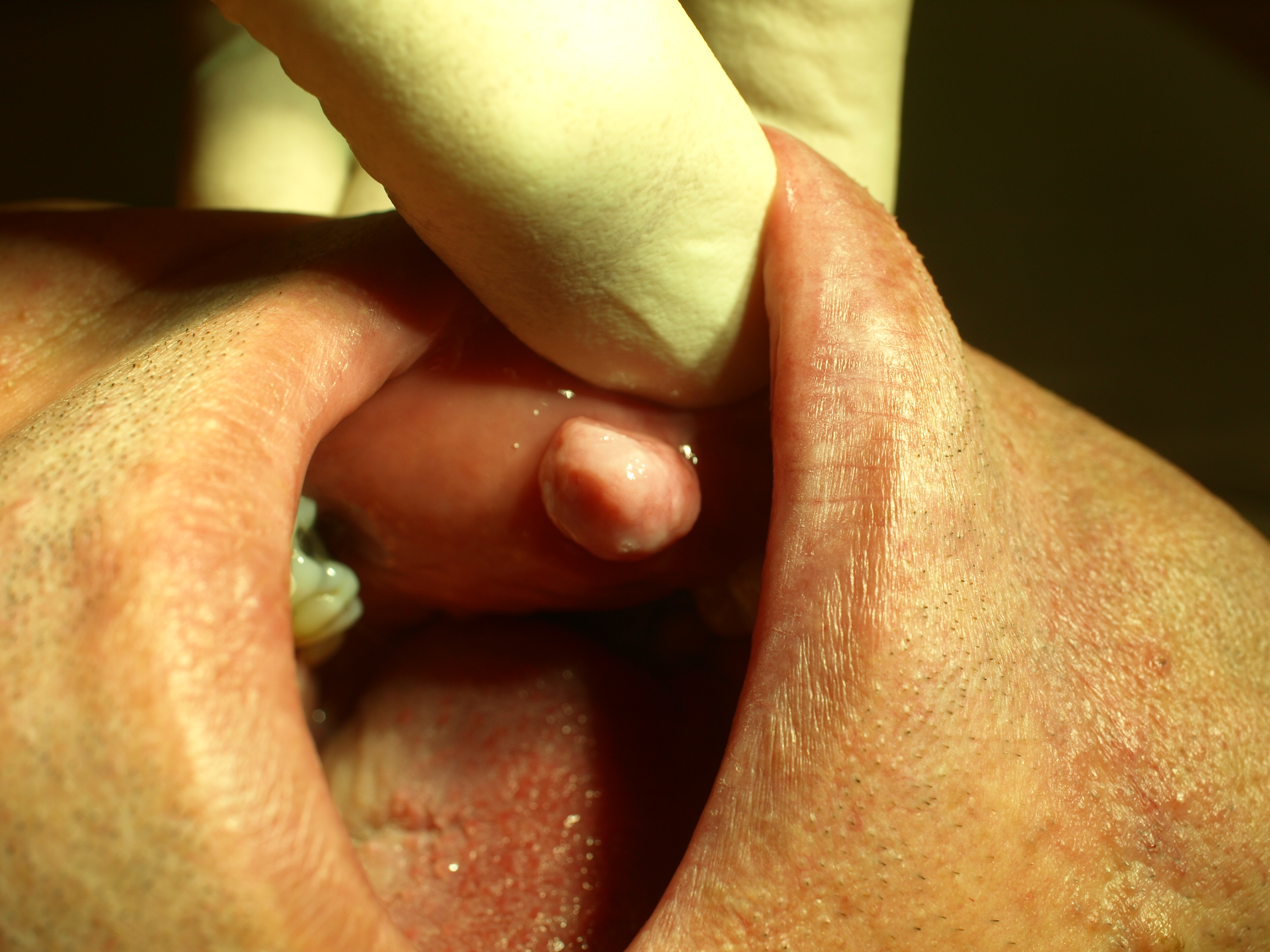
- Irritation fibroma on the left cheek of a 40-year-old man.
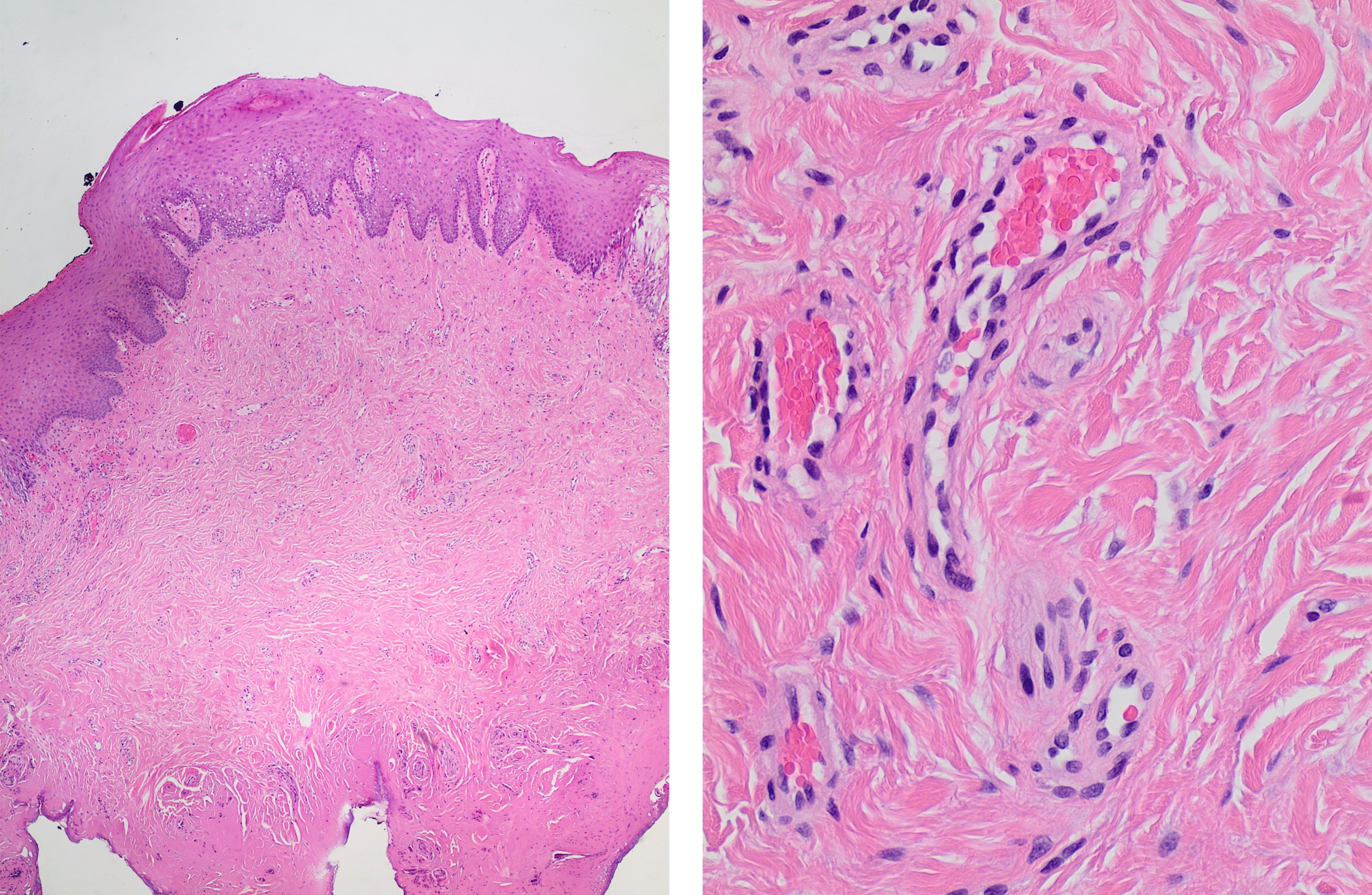
- Histopathology of irritation fibroma. Low magnification (left) characteristically shows a nonencapsulated nodular mass. High magnification (right) shows fibrous connective tissue with collagen bundles, and some blood vessels and fibroblasts.
- Specialty: Gastroenterology
- Symptoms: Palpable nodule
- Frequency: 1–2% of adults

Irritation fibroma is a type of fibroma that occurs on the mucosa of the oral cavity. Irritation fibromas are common benign tumors that are asymptomatic and resemble scarring. They are caused by prolonged irritation in the mouth, such as cheek or lip biting, rubbing from teeth, and dental prostheses.

The fibromas are firm, smooth, and fibrous with a color usually identical to the oral mucosa but can be paler. If wounded, it may be darker. They are usually solitary and do not develop into oral cancer.

== Pathophysiology ==
The epidermis of irritation fibromas typically exhibits enlargement (hyperplasia) and thickening of the stratum corneum (hyperkeratosis). They grow outward from the surface (exophytic) and often have a distinct boundary. The base is either sessile or pedunculated. Their growth is painless and slow, taking months or years, and rarely exceeding a diameter of one and a half centimeters. They are not true neoplasms, but are instead a focal increase in the amount of connective tissue. The histology of the fibromas shows dense collagen fibers, and the proliferation of mature fibroblasts and blood vessels which are dilated within the dermis of the nodule. There is slight or no infiltration of inflammatory cells.

== Diagnosis ==
Irritation fibromas are surmised based on their clinical features but a histopathological examination (such as a biopsy) can be done.

== Treatment ==
Surgical excision is available as a treatment for irritation fibromas. Though its reoccurrence is rare, it can happen if the cause of irritation continues. Therefore, managing the cause is essential. Irritation fibromas do not go away on their own if left untreated.

== Epidemiology ==
Irritation fibromas can occur at any age but are most common in older individuals, particularly in their fifties and sixties. They are twice as common in females. One to two percent of adults have this condition.
