= Gingival enlargement =

Increase in size of the gums

- Other names: Gingival overgrowth (GO), hypertrophic gingivitis, gingival hyperplasia, gingival hypertrophy
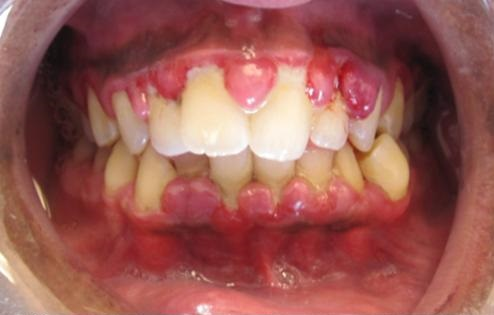
- Gingivitis, a common cause of inflammatory gingival enlargement.
- Specialty: Periodontology
- Symptoms: increase in gum size
- Causes: inflammatory conditions, Drug-induced, genetic

Gingival enlargement is an increase in the size of the gingiva (gums). It is a common feature of gingival disease. Gingival enlargement can be caused by a number of factors, including inflammatory conditions and the side effects of certain medications. The treatment is based on the cause. A closely related term is epulis, denoting a localized tumor (i.e., lump) on the gingiva.

== Classification ==
The terms gingival hyperplasia and gingival hypertrophy have been used to describe this topic in the past. These are not precise descriptions of gingival enlargement because these terms are strictly histologic diagnoses, and such diagnoses require microscopic analysis of a tissue sample. Hyperplasia refers to an increased number of cells, and hypertrophy refers to an increase in the size of individual cells. As these identifications cannot be performed with a clinical examination and evaluation of the tissue, the term gingival enlargement is more properly applied. Gingival enlargement has been classified according to cause into five general groups:

- Inflammatory enlargement
- Drug induced enlargement
- Enlargement associated with systemic diseases or conditions
- Neoplastic enlargement
- False enlargement

== Causes ==
=== Inflammatory enlargement ===
Gingival enlargement has a multitude of causes. The most common is chronic inflammatory gingival enlargement, when the gingivae are soft and discolored. This is caused by tissue edema and infective cellular infiltration caused by prolonged exposure to bacterial plaque, and is treated with conventional periodontal treatment, such as scaling and root planing.

Gingivitis and gingival enlargement are often seen in mouth breathers, as a result of irritation brought on by surface dehydration, but the manner in which it is caused has not been demonstrated.

The accumulation and retention of plaque is the chief cause of inflammatory gingival enlargement. Risk factors include poor oral hygiene, as well as physical irritation of the gingiva by improper restorative and orthodontic appliances.

=== Drug-induced enlargement ===
This type of gingival enlargement is sometimes termed "drug induced gingival enlargement" or "drug influenced gingival overgrowth", abbreviated to "DIGO". Gingival enlargement may also be associated with the administration of three different classes of drugs, all producing a similar response: Gingival overgrowth is a common side effect of phenytoin, termed "Phenytoin-induced gingival overgrowth" (PIGO).

- anticonvulsants (such as phenytoin, phenobarbital, lamotrigine, vigabatrin, ethosuximide, topiramate and primidone NOT common for valproate)
- calcium channel blockers (antihypertensives such as nifedipine, amlodipine, and verapamil). The dihydropyridine derivative isradipidine can replace nifedipine and does not induce gingival overgrowth.
- cyclosporine, an immunosuppressant.

Of all cases of DIGO, about 50% are attributed to phenytoin, 30% to cyclosporins and the remaining 10-20% to calcium channel blockers.

Drug-induced enlargement has been associated with a patient's genetic predisposition, and its association with inflammation is debated. Some investigators assert that underlying inflammation is necessary for the development of drug-induced enlargement, while others purport that the existing enlargement induced by the drug effect compounds plaque retention, thus furthering the tissue response. Careful attention to oral hygiene may reduce the severity of gingival hyperplasia. In most cases, discontinuing the culprit drug resolves the hyperplasia.

=== Enlargement associated with systemic factors ===
Many systemic diseases can develop oral manifestations that may include gingival enlargement, some that are related to conditions and others that are related to disease:

- Conditioned enlargement
  - pregnancy
  - puberty
  - vitamin C deficiency
  - nonspecific, such as a pyogenic granuloma
- Systemic disease causing enlargement
  - leukemia
  - granulolomatous diseases, such as granulomatosis with polyangiitis, sarcoidosis, or orofacial granulomatosis.
  - neoplasm
    - benign neoplasms, such as fibromas, papillomas and giant cell granulomas
    - malignant neoplasms, such as a carcinoma or melanoma
  - false gingival enlargements, such as when there is an underlying bony or dental tissue lesion

== Mechanism ==
Drug Induced gingival overgrowth:

- Fibrotic type:
  - Elevated CTGF (a.k.a. CCN2) which is a matricellular protein known to be reliable for fibrosis.
    - TGF-β increases drives CTGF/CCN2 (current molecular mechanisms unknown), but supports TGF-β as a therapeutic target.
    - CTGF is not down regulated in presence of inflammatory mediators (such as PGE_{2}), unlike other tissues' fibroblasts (such as kidney) which have their CTGF levels down regulated by the same PGE_{2}.
- Inflammatory Type

== Management ==
The first line management of gingival overgrowth is improved oral hygiene, ensuring that the irritative plaque is removed from around the necks of the teeth and gums. Situations in which the chronic inflammatory gingival enlargement include significant fibrotic components that do not respond to and undergo shrinkage when exposed to scaling and root planing are treated with surgical removal of the excess tissue, most often with a procedure known as gingivectomy.

In DIGO, improved oral hygiene and plaque control is still important to help reduce any inflammatory component that may be contributing to the overgrowth. Reversing and preventing gingival enlargement caused by drugs is as easy as ceasing drug therapy or substituting to another drug. However, this is not always an option; in such a situation, alternative drug therapy may be employed, if possible, to avoid this deleterious side effect. In the case of immunosuppression, tacrolimus is an available alternative which results in much less severe gingival overgrowth than cyclosporin, but is similarly as nephrotoxic. The dihydropyridine derivative isradipidine can replace nifedipine for some uses of calcium channel blocking and does not induce gingival overgrowth.

== Epidemiology ==
Gingival enlargement is common.

== Other animals ==
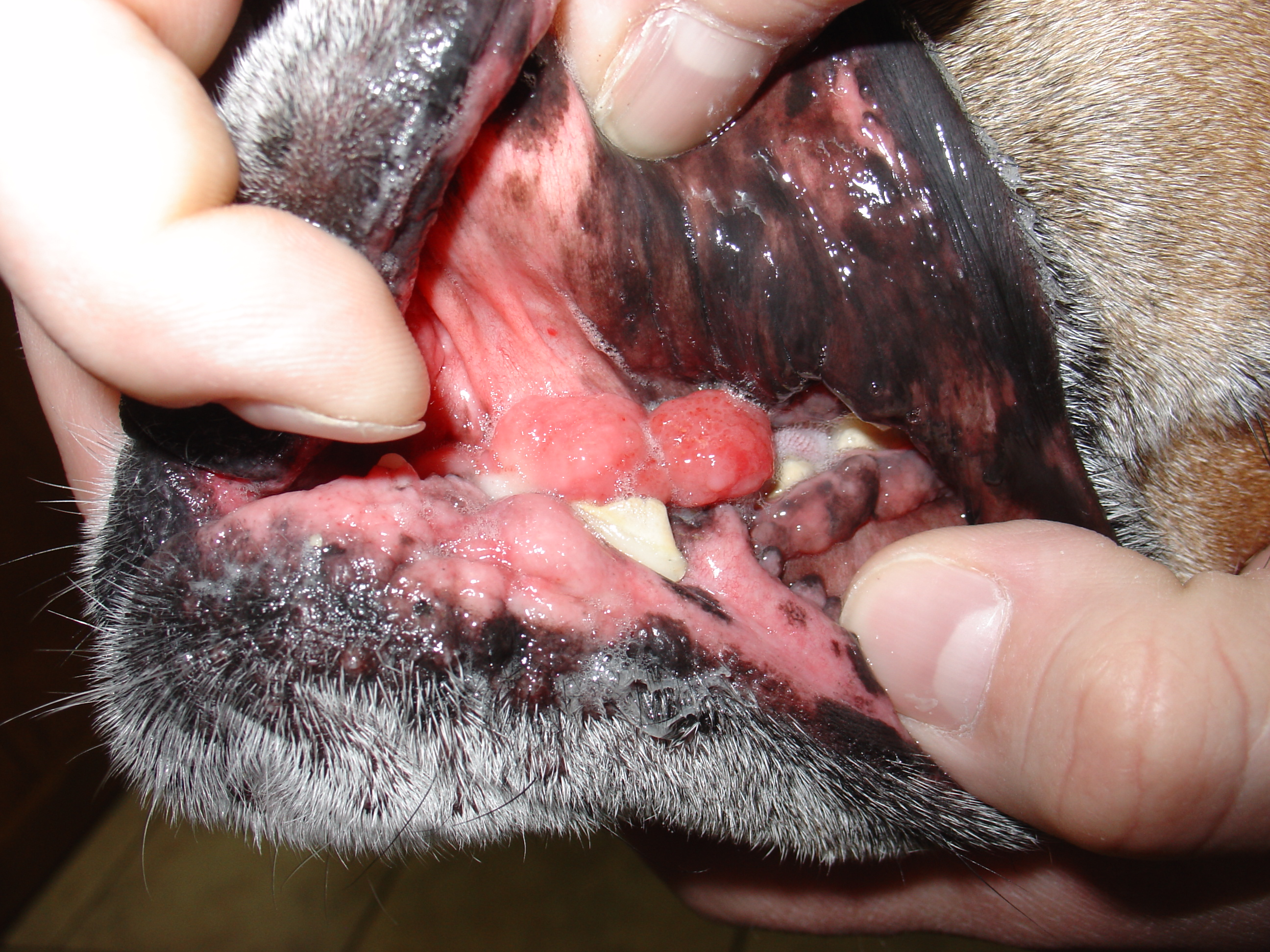
Gingival hyperplasia

It is commonly seen in Boxer dogs and other brachycephalic breeds, and in the English Springer Spaniel. It usually starts around middle age and progresses. Some areas of the gingiva can become quite large but have only a small attachment to the rest of the gingiva, and it may completely cover the teeth. Infection and inflammation of the gingiva is common with this condition. Under anesthesia, the enlarged areas of gingiva can be cut back with a scalpel blade or CO_{2} laser, but it often recurs. Gingival enlargement is also a potential sequela of gingivitis. As in humans, it may be seen as a side effect to the use of ciclosporin.
