= Papilloma =

- Other names: Papillomas, papllomata, papillomatous tumo[u]r
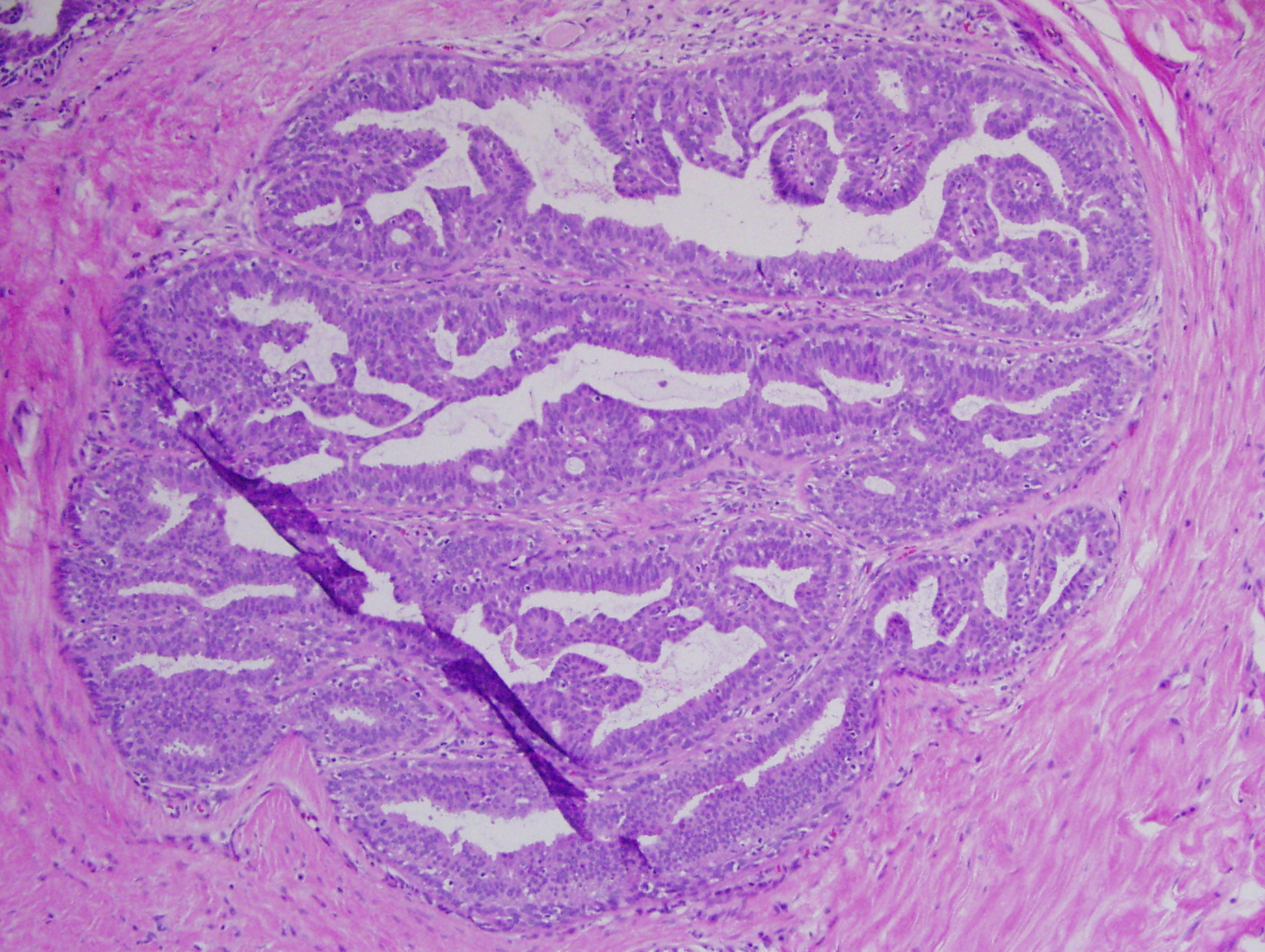
- Intraductal papilloma of breast, H&E stained, 10×
- Specialty: Oncology

A papilloma (plural papillomas or papillomata) (papillo- + -oma) is a benign epithelial tumor growing exophytically (outwardly projecting) in nipple-like and often finger-like fronds. In this context, papilla refers to the projection created by the tumor, not a tumor on an already existing papilla (such as the nipple).

When used without context, it frequently refers to infections (squamous cell papilloma) caused by a human papillomavirus (HPV), most commonly in the form of warts. Human papillomavirus infections are a major cause of cervical cancer, vulvar cancer, vaginal cancer, penile cancer, anal cancer, and HPV-positive oropharyngeal cancers. Most viral warts are caused by human papillomavirus infection (HPV). There are nearly 200 distinct human papillomaviruses (HPVs), and many types are carcinogenic. There are, however, a number of other conditions that cause papillomas, and in many cases the cause may be uncertain.

== Signs and symptoms ==
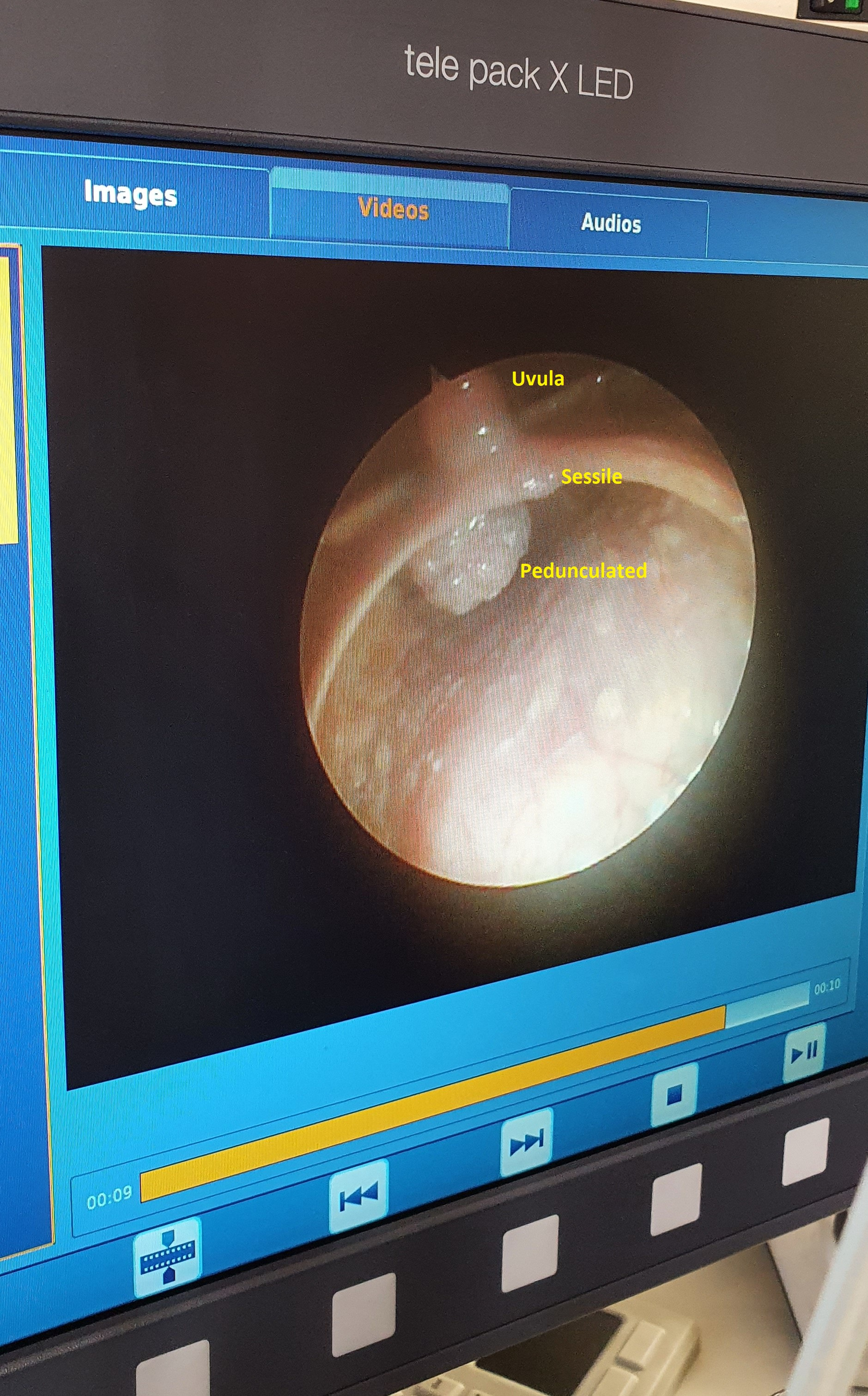
HPV6 pedunculated papilloma behind the uvula, and HPV6 sessile (flat) papilloma next to the uvula

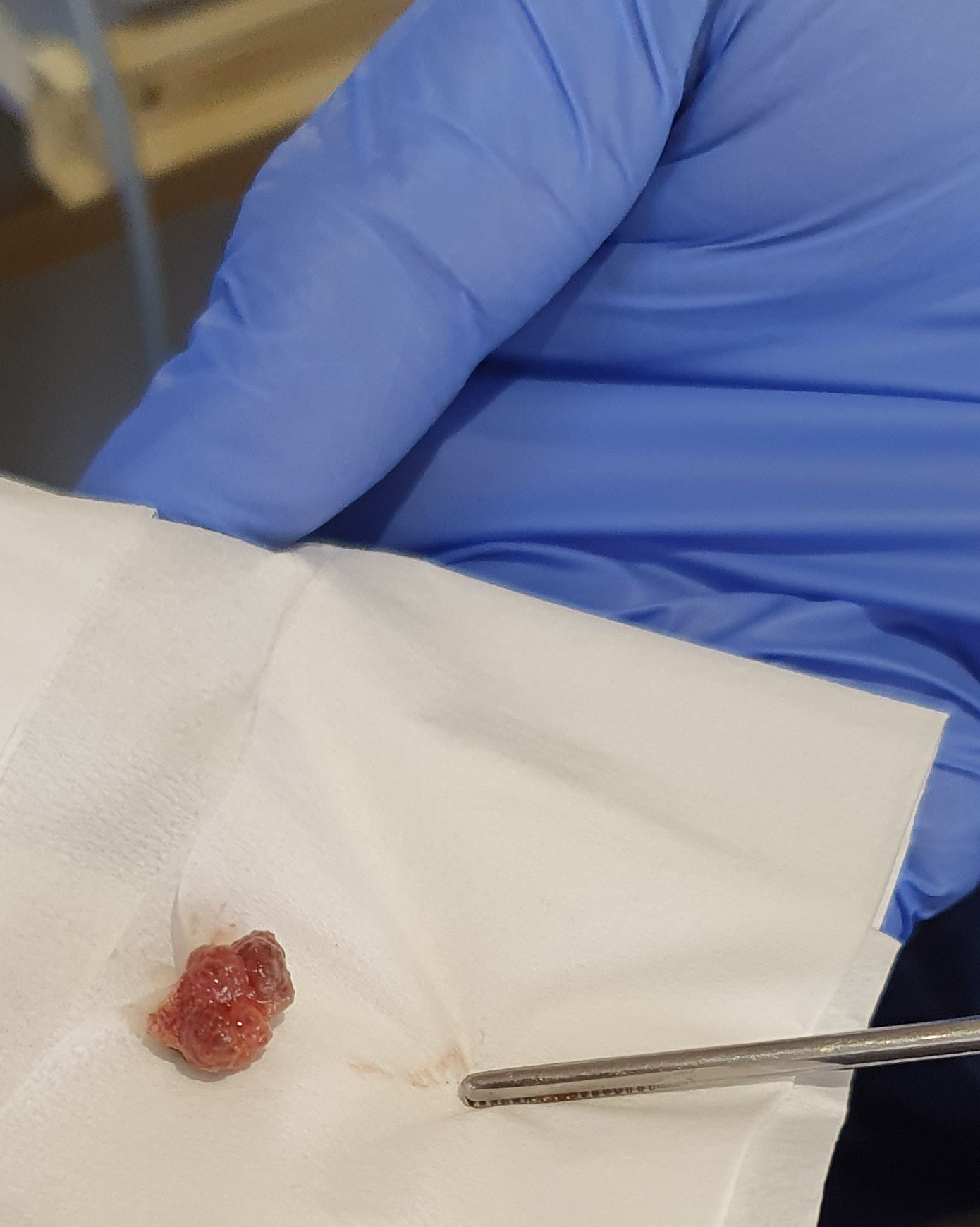
HPV6 pedunculated papilloma removed from behind the uvula using a laser

Papillomas are benign epithelial tumors characterized by exophytic papillary growth. It may appear white or normal-colored. It may be pedunculated or sessile. The typical size range is 1–5 cm. Neither sex is significantly more likely to develop papillomas. The most common site is the palate–uvula area, followed by tongue and lips. Durations range from weeks to 10 or more years.

== Presence of HPV ==
Immunoperoxidase stains have identified antigens of the human papillomavirus (HPV) types 6 and 11 in approximately 50% of cases of squamous cell papilloma.

== Prognosis ==
Papillomas are benign epithelial lesions commonly associated with human papillomavirus (HPV), while certain HPV types are linked to cancer development.

== Differential diagnosis ==
Other conditions which may present similar symptoms (and which are also caused by HPV infections) include:

- Intraoral verruca vulgaris (common warts)
- Condyloma acuminatum (genital warts)
- Focal epithelial hyperplasia (oral warts)

Differentiation is done accurately by microscopic examination.

== Treatment ==
With conservative surgical excision, recurrence is rare.

== See also ==
- Skin tag
- Inverted papilloma
- Squamous cell papilloma
- Urothelial papilloma
- Intraductal papilloma of breast
- Wart
  - Genital wart
  - Plantar wart
- Papillomavirus
  - Human papillomavirus
