= List of anatomical variations =

Mundane anatomical variations in humans

This article provides a comprehensive list of anatomical variations, which are naturally occurring differences in human morphology. These variations are not considered defects or abnormalities but rather normal deviations that do not inherently indicate pathology. The frequencies in the tables below are mostly derived from meta-analyses. They are reported as percentage with 95% confidence intervals.

== Head and neck ==
=== Skeletal variations ===
Name	Other Names	Description	Frequency
Accessory maxillary ostium		see Maxillary sinus	
Arcuate foramen			9.1% (8.2%—10.1%)
Arcus praebasiocipitalis			
Basilar tubercle of clivus			9.8%
Canalis basilaris medianus			
Clivus bony canal			
Collateral eminence			
Condylus tertius			
Craniopharyngeal canal			
Foramen tympanicum			
Fossa navicularis magna			
Haller cell		see Ethmoid Sinus	
Interparietal bone	Os Interparietale, Inca bone		
Innominate canal of Arnold			
Intermediate condylar canal			
Os odontoideum			0.21%, (0.00%—0.72%)
Ossiculum terminale (of dens)	Bergmann's ossicle		
Ossified petrosphenoid ligament			
Sagittal keel			
Sphenoethmoidal air cell	Onodi cell	see Sphenoid sinus	
Stafne bone cavity			0.17% (0.14%—0.21%)
Thyroid foramen		see Thyroid cartilage	24.5% (19.2—29.8%)
Transverse basilar cleft	Saucer's fissure	see Clivus	
Tubercle at the anterior rim of foramen magnum			
Wormian bones	Sutural bones		

=== Muscular variations ===
Name	Other Names	Description	Frequency
Accessory slip of levator palpebrae superioris			
Accessory belly of Digastric muscle			
Atlantomastoid muscle			
Axiobasilaris muscle	Epistropheo-basilaris		
Cleidoatlanticus muscle			
Cleidocervical muscle			
Cleidofascialis muscle			
Cleidohyoideus muscle			
Cleidomastoideus muscle			
Cleidooccipitalis cervicalis muscle			
Cricocorniculate muscle			
Cricohyoid muscle		variation of thyrohyoid	
Fissured tongue			
Levator claviculae muscle			
Levator glandulae thyroidea		levator muscle of thyroid gland	
Pterygoideus proprius muscle			
Sternoclavicularis anticus muscle			
Styloauricularis muscle			
Transversus nuchae muscle			
Tellus colli			

=== Vascular variations ===
Name	Other Names	Description	Frequency
Persistent primitive olfactory artery			
Persistent proatlantal artery			
Artery of Percheron			
Stapedial artery			
Thyroid ima artery			3.8% (2.7%—4.9%)
Fourth thyroid vein	Fourth thyroid vein of Kocher	see Inferior thyroid veins	
Falcine sinus			2.5% (0.7%—5.4%)
Hypoglossal artery			
Persistent left superior vena cava			
Trigeminal artery			

=== Nervous variations ===
Name	Other Names	Description	Frequency
Aberrant facial nerve course			
Accessory hypoglossal nerve			
Trigeminal nerve duplication			

=== Other variations ===
Name	Other Names	Description	Frequency
Anisocoria			
Crease of the upper eyelid		Single or Double eyelid	
Empty sella turcica			
Epicanthic fold			
Darwin's tubercle			
Diagonal earlobe crease			
Preauricular sinus			
Zuckerkandl's tubercle	Pyramidal lobe of thyroid gland		

== Vertebral column ==
=== Skeletal variations ===
Name	Other Names	Description	Frequency
Atlanto-occipital fusion		see Atlanto-occipital joint	0.64% (0.00%–1.00 %)
Atlas arch defect	Ossification anomalies of the atlas		
Block vertebrae			
Butterfly vertebrae			
Cervical ribs			
Coccygeal ribs			
Diastematomyelia	Split cord malformation		
Lumbosacral transitional vertebrae			
Oppenheimer's ossicle			
Sagittal cleft vertebrae			
Spondylolisthesis			
Spondylolysis			
Sprengel's deformity	high scapula, scapular hypoplasia		

== Thorax ==
=== Skeletal variations ===
Name	Other names	Description	Frequency
Bifid rib			
Bifid xiphoid process		see Xiphoid process	
Episternal ossicles			2.1% (1.1%–3.0%)
Manubriosternal fusion		see Sternum	
Sternal cleft			
Sternal foramen			8.9% (6.5%–11.7%)
Sternoxiphoidal fusion			
Xiphoid foramen			

=== Muscular variations ===
Name	Other names	Description	Frequency
Sternalis muscle	Rectus Thoracis		6% (5%–7%)
Costocoracoideus muscle			

=== Other variations ===
Name	Other names	Description	Frequency
Azygos lobe of the lung			
Cardiac bronchus		see Bronchus	
Horseshoe lung			
Supernumerary lung fissures			
Supernumerary nipple			
Tracheal bronchus		see Bronchus	

== Upper limb ==
=== Skeletal variations ===
Name	Other names	Description	Frequency
Bifurcated clavicle			
Bipartite capitate			
Coracoclavicular joint			
Carpal boss			
Carpal coalition			
Os acromiale		see Acromion	
Scapular foramina and tunnels			
Supracondylar process of the humerus			

=== Muscular variations ===
Name	Other names	Description	Frequency
Accessory subscapularis muscle			
Axillary arch muscle			
Chondroepitrochlearis muscle		see Pectoralis major	
Coracocapsularis muscle			
Costodeltoideus muscle			
Epitrochleoanconeus muscle	Anconeus epitrochlearis		
Extensor carpi radialis tertius muscle	Extensor carpi radialis accessorius		
Extensor digitorum brevis manus muscle			
Extensor indicis et medii communis muscle			
Extensor medii proprius muscle			
Extensor pollicis et indicis communis muscle			
Flexor carpi radialis profundus muscle			
Linburg-Comstock variation		Tendinous conjunction of the Flexor Pollucis Longus and Flexor Digitorum Profundus	20.3% ( 14.3%–27.0%)
Palmaris profundus muscle			
Pisiuncinatus muscle	Pisohamate		
Sternochondrocoracoideus muscle			
Sternohumeralis muscle			
Subclavius posticus	Chondroscapularis		
Subscapularis minor muscle			
Ulnaris quinti muscle			
Tensor semivaginae articulations humeroscapularis muscle			
Thoracobrachialis muscle			

=== Vascular variations ===
Name	Other names	Description	Frequency
Alar thoracic artery			
Median artery			12.2% (6.5%–19.2%)
Superficial ulnar artery			
Variation of the basilic vein			

=== Nervous variations ===
Name	Other names	Description	Frequency
Bifid median nerve		see Median nerve	
Berrettini anastomosis			
Froment-Rauber nerve			
Martin-Gruber anastomosis			
Nerve of McKenzie			
Riché-Cannieu anastomosis			

=== Other variations ===
Name	Other names	Description	Frequency
Accessory nail of the fifth toe			
Osborne's ligament			
Struthers' ligament			

== Lower limb ==
=== Skeletal variations ===
Name	Other names	Description	Frequency
Accessory navicula			
Calcaneonavicular coalition			
Cyamella		Sesamoid in the Popliteus muscle tendon.	
Fabella		Sesamoid bone in the lateral head of the Gastrocnemius muscle.	
Femoral anteversion/retroversion			
Os tibiale externum			
Os trigonum			
Talocalcaneal coalition			
Talus accessorius			

=== Muscular variations ===
Name	Other names	Description	Frequency
Accessory popliteus muscle			
Accessory soleus muscle			
Adductor minimus muscle			
Fibularis quartus muscle	Peroneus quartus		
Gastrocnemius tertius muscle		see Gastrocnemius muscle	
Gluteoperinealis muscle			
Gluteus quartus muscle			
fibulocalcaneus internus muscle	Peroneocalcaneus internus		
Popliteus biceps muscle			
Tensor fasciae suralis muscle			

=== Vascular variations ===
Name	Other names	Description	Frequency
Corona mortis		see Obturator artery	

=== Nervous variations ===
Name	Other names	Description	Frequency
Accessory deep fibular nerve			
Accessory obturator nerve			
Furcal nerve			

== Abdomen ==
=== Muscular variations ===
Name	Other names	Description	Frequency
Interfoveolar muscle			
Pubotransversalis muscle			
Saphenous muscle			

=== Vascular variations ===
Name	Other names	Description	Frequency
Arc of Bühler	Bühler's anastomotic artery		
Marginal artery of the colon	Marginal artery of Drummond		
Third mesenteric artery			

=== Other variations ===
Name	Other names	Description	Frequency
Accessory spleen			
Accessory pancreatic duct			
Agenesis of vermiform appendix		see Appendix (anatomy)	
Annular pancreas			
Bifid pancreas tail			
Colon duplication			
Double common bile duct			
Gastropancreatic ligament			
Pancreas divisum			

== Pelvis ==
=== Vascular variations ===
Name	Other names	Description	Frequency
Uterine artery anastomoses variations			

=== Other variations ===
Name	Other names	Description	Frequency
Bladder exstrophy			
Hirsuties coronae glandis			
Horseshoe kidney (Ren arcuatus)			
Renal artery anomalies			
Splenogonadal fusion			
Supernumerary ovaries			
