= Accessory muscle =

Rare anatomic duplication of a muscle

An accessory muscle is a relatively rare anatomical variation where duplication of a muscle may appear anywhere in the muscular system. Treatment is not indicated unless the accessory muscle interferes with normal function.

== Examples ==
Examples are the accessory soleus muscle in the calf or ankle, the extensor digitorum brevis manus in the hand and epitrochleoanconeus muscle of the upper arm.

Additional examples in the hand include Flexor carpi radialis brevis which can compress the anterior interosseous nerve. Also see palmaris profundus muscle.

On the extensor side: extensor digitorum brevis manus, extensor carpi radialis intermedius, extensor medii proprius muscle

Accessory muscles of the anterior thoracic wall include the sternalis muscle, the axillary arch (Langer's), variations of pectoralis major such as the pectoralis minimus, pectoralis quartus, and pectoralis intermedius, the chondrocoracoideus and chondrofascialis. The whole pectoral region is subject to a high degree of variability. The pectoralis major or pectoralis minor may be absent, or in some cases the pectoralis major may be doubled. Other variants noted in this region are the chondroepitrochleas originating in one or more ribs, or directly from the pectoralis major; the costocoracoideus from the 6th to 8th ribs, and a chondrocoracoideus and another variant of this waiting to be named. Most of these accessory muscles are implicated in neurovascular compression. Of clinical use the newly described chondrocoracoideus has potential for use in reconstructive surgery.

Axillary accessory muscles may be encountered in axillary lymph node removal, the awareness of which could avoid complications.

An accessory muscle can also refer to a muscle that is not primarily responsible for movement but does provide assistance. Examples of such muscles are the accessory muscles of respiration where the sternocleidomastoid and the scalene muscles (anterior, middle and posterior scalene) are typically considered accessory muscles of respiration.

== See also ==
- Accessory bone
- List of muscles of the human body
