= Posterior fossa =

Posterior fossa may refer to:

- Posterior cranial fossa, an area of the head
- PHACES Syndrome, a condition of the posterior cranial fossa
- Posterior intercondyloid fossa, an area of the tibia
