= Odilon Lannelongue =

French surgeon (1840–1911)

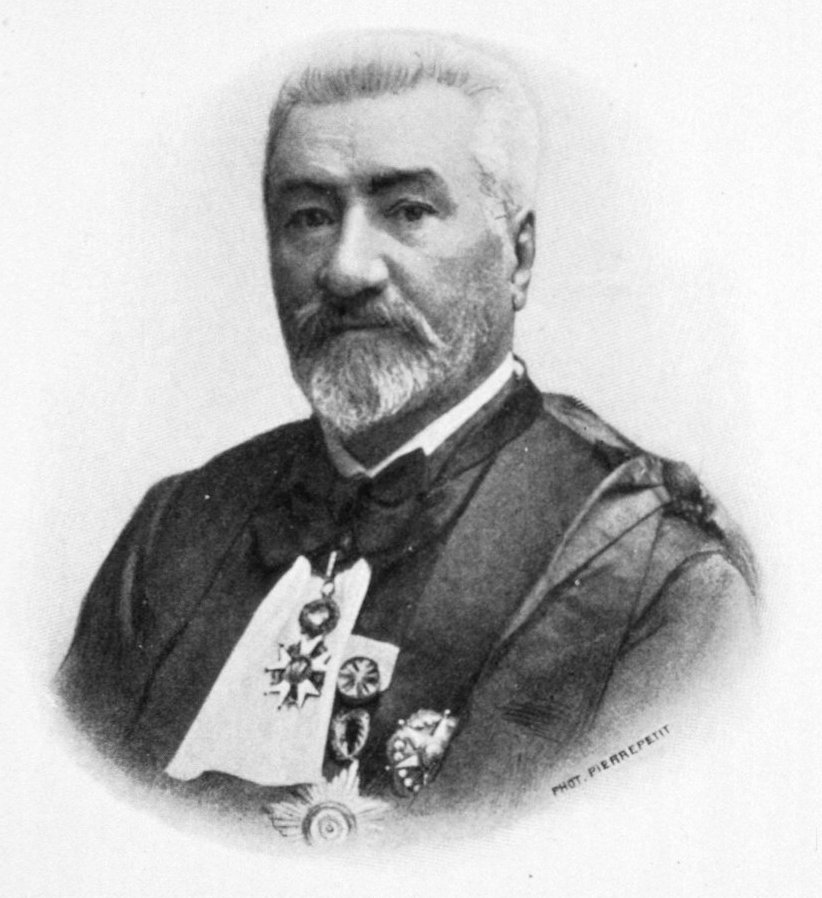
- Born: 4 December 1840
- Died: 22 December 1911 (aged 71)
- Occupation: surgeon
- Known for: bone diseases
- Notable work: osteomyelitis and bone tuberculosis

Odilon Marc Lannelongue (4 December 1840 – 22 December 1911) was a French surgeon who was a native of Castéra-Verduzan.

In 1867 he earned his medical doctorate at Paris, where he was a student of Charles-Pierre Denonvilliers (1808–1872) and Auguste Nélaton (1807–1873). In 1883 he became a professor at the Faculté de Médecine de Paris, and in 1895 became a member of the Academy of Sciences. Later in life he became interested in politics, being chosen as senator from the department of Gers in 1906.

Lannelongue is remembered for his work involving bone diseases, especially osteomyelitis and bone tuberculosis. In 1892 he performed the first craniectomy for craniosynostosis, an operation that involved correction of a sagittal synostosis. He is also credited for introducing a method of treatment for synovial tuberculosis through the use of chloride of zinc injections.

In 1911 he founded the Médaille internationale de chirurgie (Foundation Lannelongue) in memory of his wife, Marie Lannelongue (née Cibiel), who served as a nurse during the Franco-Prussian War. This award is issued every five years by the Académie nationale de chirurgie (National Academy of Surgery). During his medical career, Lannelongue had several famous persons as patients, such as Léon Gambetta, Sarah Bernhardt and Félix Faure.

== Associated eponyms ==
- Lannelongue's foramina: Also known as foramina venarum minimarum, which are foramina of the smallest veins of the heart.
- Lannelongue's ligaments: Also known as sternopericardiac ligaments.
