= PHACE syndrome =

Congenital condition of brain, cardiovascular and eye abnormalities

PHACE Syndrome
- Other names: Pascual–Castroviejo type II syndrome, P-CIIS, Pascual–Castroviejo syndrome type 2
- Specialty: Medical genetics

PHACE syndrome is a medical condition characterized by uncommon associations between birth defects of the brain, skin (large facial infantile hemangiomas), arteries, heart and eyes. "PHACE" is an acronym for the parts of the body the syndrome usually impacts:

- Posterior fossa abnormalities and other structural brain abnormalities.
- Hemangioma(s) of the cervical facial region.
- Arterial cerebrovascular anomalies.
- Cardiac defects, aortic coarctation and other aortic abnormalities.
- Eye anomalies.

Sometimes an "S" is added to PHACE making the acronym PHACES; with the "S" standing for "Sternal defects" and/or "Supraumbilical raphe." PHACE syndrome may affect infants with large plaque-type facial hemangiomas. Children who present this skin condition should receive careful ophthalmologic, cardiac, and neurologic assessment. According to one study of infants with large hemangiomas, one-third have symptoms consistent with the diagnosis of PHACE syndrome. The most common are cerebrovascular and cardiovascular anomalies.

== Signs and symptoms ==
Hemangiomas associated with PHACE syndrome are generally small or not visible at birth, but often escalate after days or weeks, gradually becoming easier to see. They also tend to cover a large area of the face, head, or neck, either as one lesion or as many individual lesions.

Patients with PHACE syndrome may also experience symptoms such as:

- Anomalies of the aortic arch.
- Narrowing, abnormal growth, or absence of a major cerebral artery.
- Presence of the trigeminal artery, an important artery that supplies the brain with nutrients during fetal development, as well as others after birth.
- Abnormalities of the cerebellum.
- Blood clots in the blood vessels around the heart and brain.
- Abnormal structure of the back of the eye.
- Abnormal sternum.
- Gaps in the wall between the left and right ventricles of the heart.
- Anomalies of the pituitary and thyroid glands.

== Cause and complications ==
=== Cause ===
The cause of PHACE syndrome is currently unknown. Researchers believe that it is caused by a postzygotic somatic mosaic mutation, or a mutation that can occur on any autosomal chromosome. Research is complicated due to the mosaic nature of the disease. The disorder may be caused by genetic factors, environmental factors, or a combination of the two.

=== Complications ===
As it grows, the hemangioma can break down the skin, distort facial features, or get in the way of other vital functions, such as breathing, vision, and hearing. Further complications will depend on what other structures are involved. These could include developmental delay, seizures, headaches, and abnormal muscle tone if the brain is affected.

== Diagnosis ==
Since the initial sign of PHACE syndrome is usually a large facial hemangioma, infants born with this condition should be further evaluated to diagnose or rule out PHACE syndrome through a series of radiologic tests such as magnetic resonance images (MRI) or magnetic resonance angiograms (MRA) of the head, neck, and chest. Following the imaging tests, the physician should perform an echocardiogram on the infant to observe any abnormalities. If abnormalities are detected on these scans, the infant may have PHACE syndrome.

=== Treatment ===
Due to the disorder's rarity, there are no standardized treatment protocols or guidelines and no medical treatment trials for affected individuals as of 2022. Various treatments have been reported in the medical literature as part of single case reports or small series of patients.

Physicians treat specific complications and effects of the disorder in order to improve the lives of patients. Treatment usually involves collaboration between many medical professionals. These medical professionals include, but are not limited to, dermatologists; ophthalmologists; cardiologists; endocrinologists; neurologists and or neurosurgeons; otolaryngologists; dentists; speech pathologists; psychiatrists; and many others.

=== Management ===
PHACE syndrome needs to be managed by a multidisciplinary team of experts. Additional specialties such as cardiology, ophthalmology, neurology, and neurosurgery may need to be involved. The experts pay close attention to how these children develop throughout school-age.

Since the establishment of the PHACE syndrome community non-profit in 2013, it has been raising awareness about the condition, supporting patients and families of those with the disease, and raising money for research into causes and treatment.

== History ==
In 1993, a correlation between large facial hemangiomas and brain defects among 9 subjects was reported. 3 years later, a larger case study was published showing a wider spectrum of grouped malformations. The association of anomalies and the PHACES acronym was first coined by Dr. Vail Reese and Dr. Ilona Frieden in 1996, making it a newly described syndrome. A diagnosis is generally made from the physical examination, along with imaging of the head and chest, and an eye examination. PHACE is most commonly diagnosed among female infants. Long-term quality of life varies.

The hemangioma growth phase can last anywhere from 6 to 18 months. Then involution, or healing, of the hemangioma begins. Laser and other surgeries can usually make a substantial positive impact on appearance. Long after the hemangioma recedes, any damage it or the other defects caused may remain. Migraines are common, as are developmental delays.

== See also ==
- Sternal cleft
- Rosenthal–Kloepfer syndrome
- List of cutaneous conditions
