= Palmaris muscle =

Palmaris muscle may refer to:

- Palmaris brevis muscle
- Palmaris longus muscle
- Palmaris profundus muscle

== See also ==
- Palmaris (butterfly), a butterfly genus in the subtribe Pronophilina
