= Xiphodynia =

Musculoskeletal disorder

- Other names: Xiphoidalgia
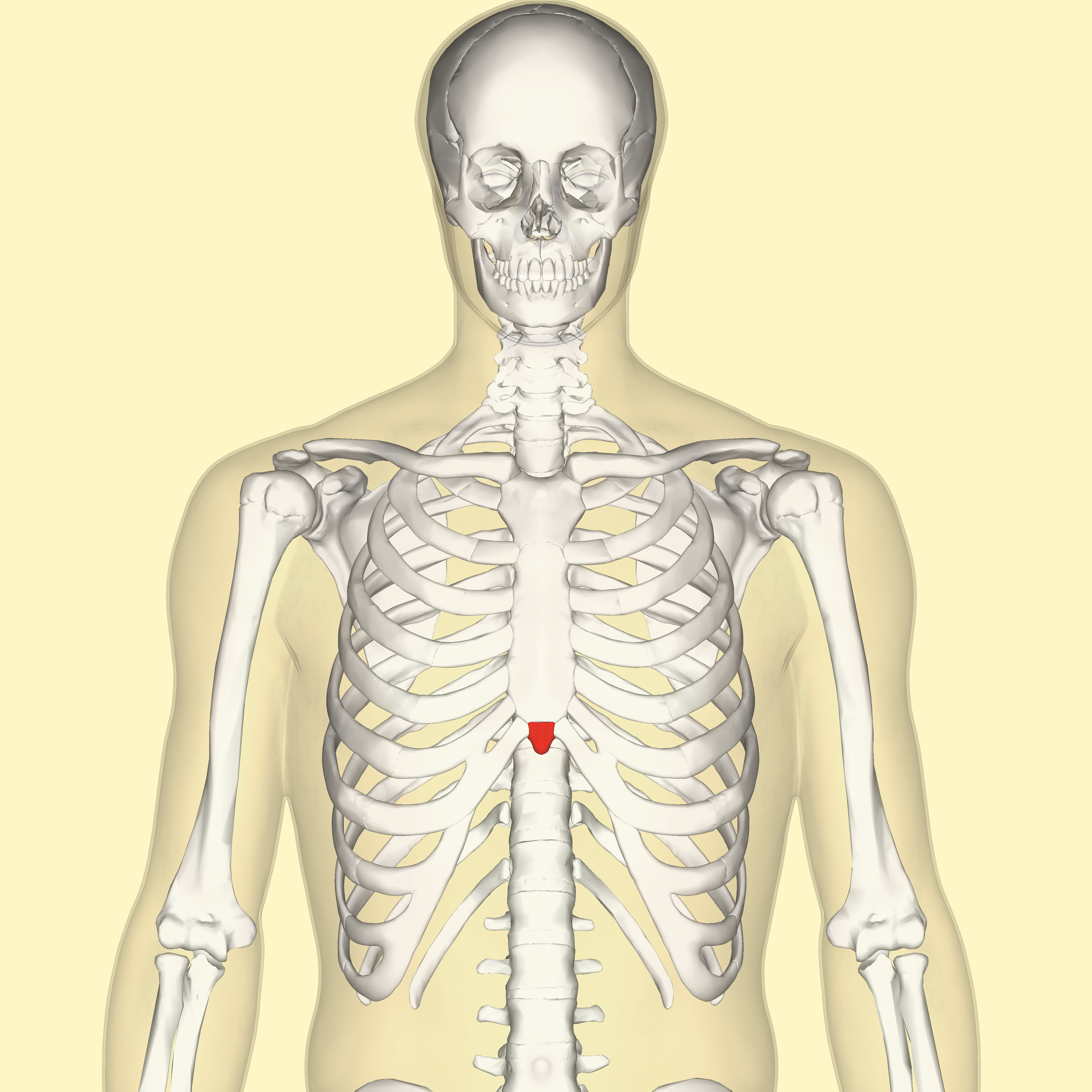
- Position of the xiphoid process (shown in red).
- Symptoms: Pain, tenderness, and discomfort in upper abdomen, chest, and throat.
- Diagnostic method: Based on symptoms after ruling out other possible causes, and palpation of the xiphoid area

Xiphodynia or Xiphoidalgia is thought to be a rare musculoskeletal syndrome that involves referred pain referred from the xiphisternal joint or the structures attached to the xiphoid process. Digital examination of the xiphoid process reproduces symptoms. Xiphodynia is in fact a relatively common condition which will be missed unless considered in the differentials list. It is caused by inflammation of the junction between the sternum and xiphoid process.

== Signs and symptoms ==
Signs and symptoms of Xiphodynia include:

- Cardiac chest pain
- Abdominal pain
- Nausea, vomiting, and diarrhea
- Radiating pain into the back, neck, shoulders, arms and chest wall
