= Sternal foramen =

Anatomical variation of the sternum

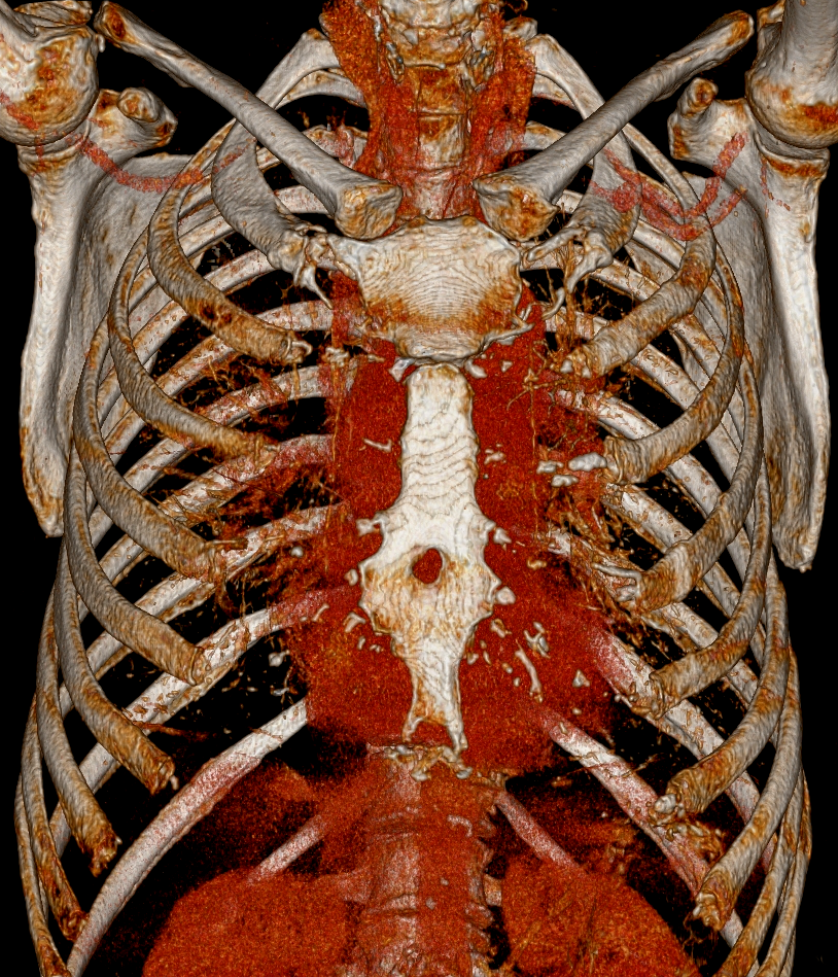
Sternal foramen seen on three-dimensionally constructed CT scan

Sternal foramen (or perforated sternum) is an oval foramen present at lower one-third of the sternum. It is a relatively common anatomical variation found in 6.5% of individuals.

== Structure ==
This variation is usually present at the lower one-third of the sternal body. It has an oval shape and a unique "bow tie" appearance when seen on axial computed tomography. The diameter of the sternal foramen ranges from 6 to 16 mm with an average diameter of 6.5 mm. Sometimes, the foramen can be present at the xiphod process. In extremely rare cases, the foramen is found at the manubrium.

Developmentally, sternal foramen results from the incomplete fusion of the sternal bars while they are still cartilaginous.

== Clinical significance ==
Although sternal foramen is asymptomatic, it may entail a risk of serious complications from blinded sternal interventions. The foramen may be misdiagnosed as sternal fracture or a gunshot wound. Awareness of sternal foramen is also crucial in acupuncture to avoid cardiac tamponade.

== Additional images ==
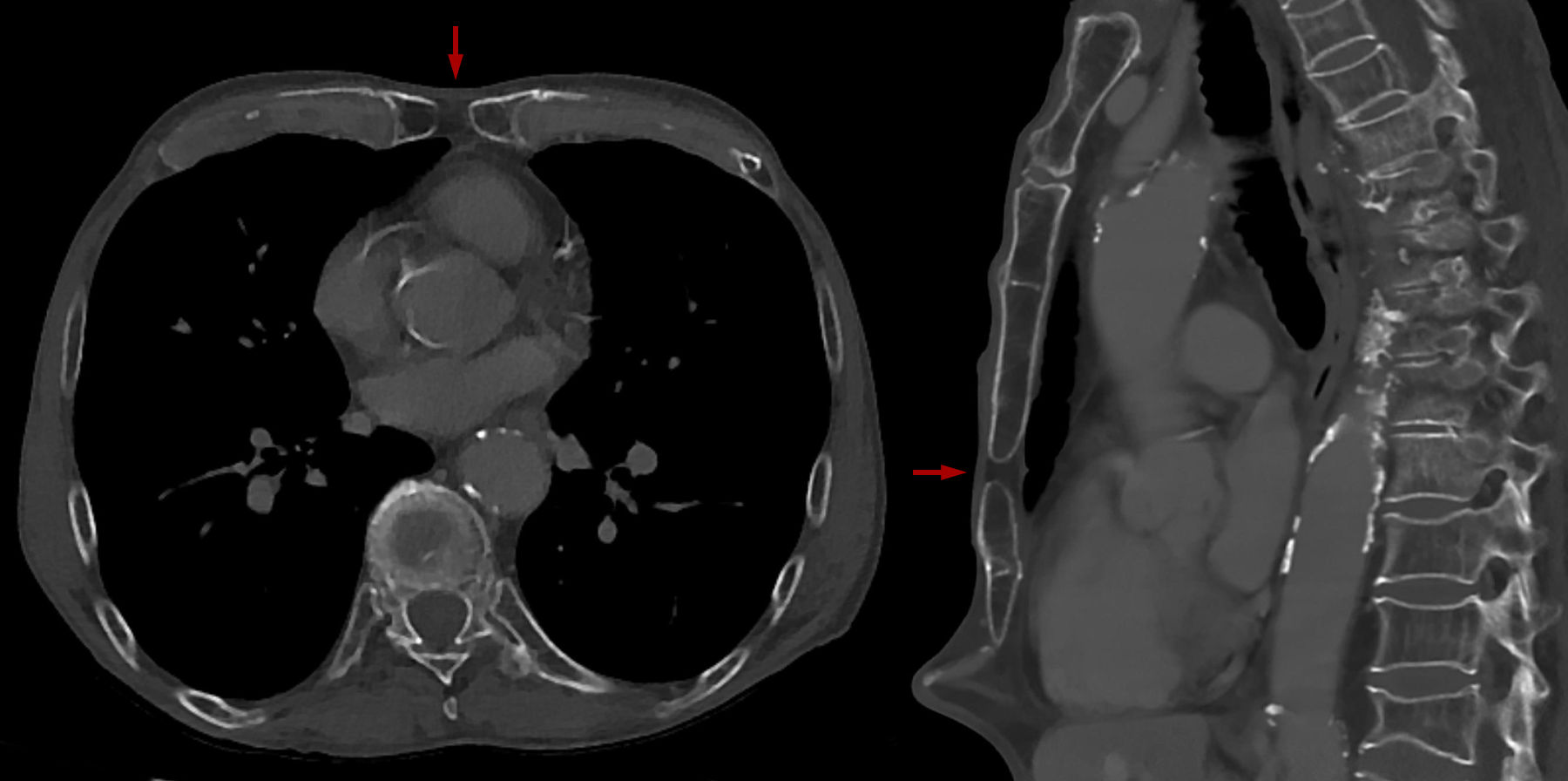
Sternal foramen on axial and sagittal CT. The "bow tie" appearance is seen on the axial view.

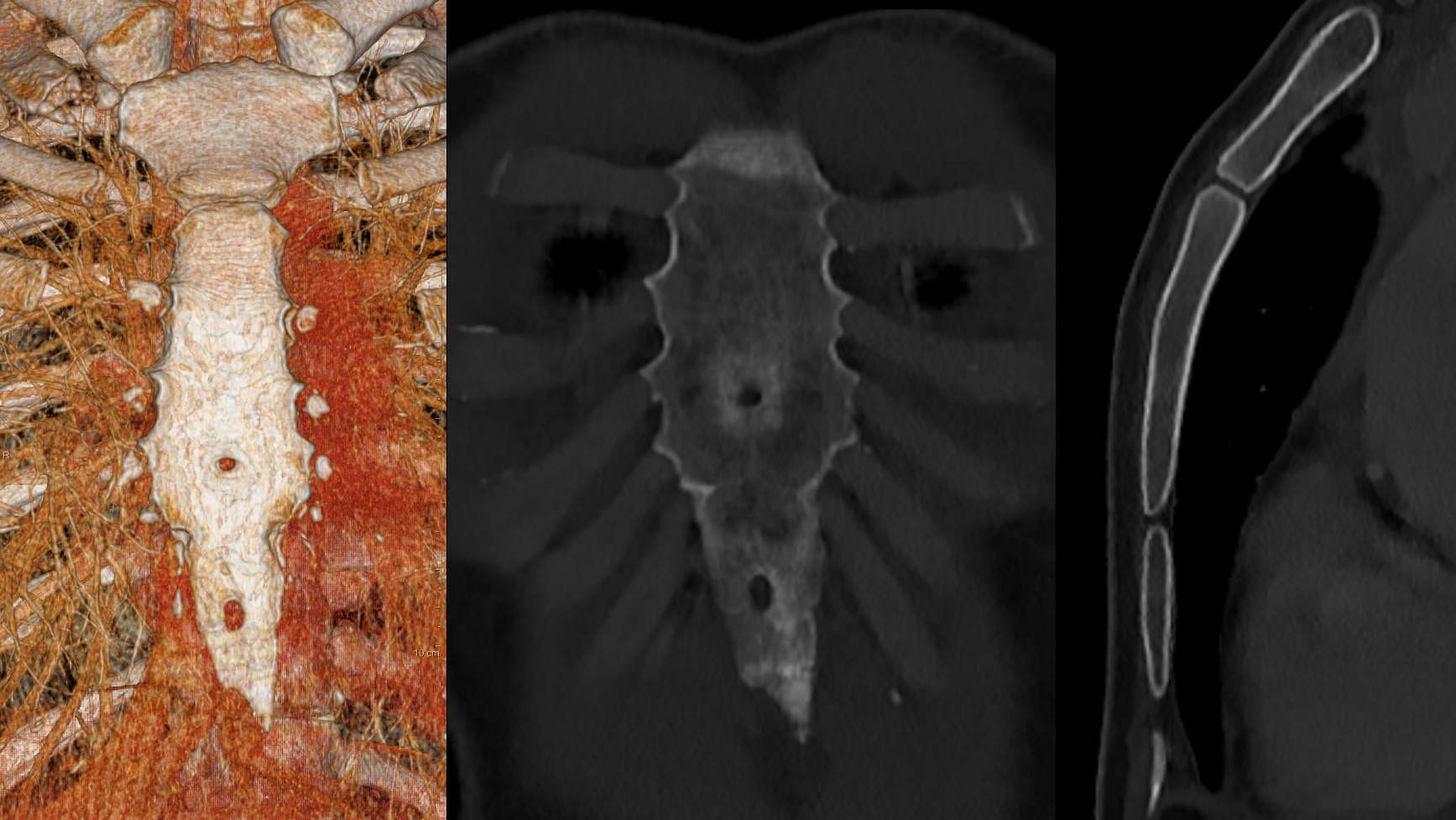
Sternal foramen and xiphoid foramen

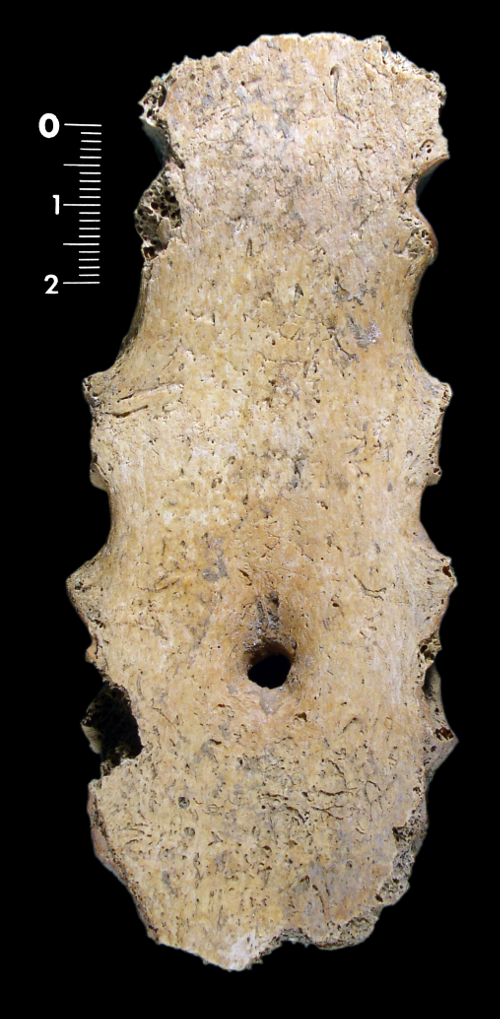
Sternal foramen observed in dry skeleton

A 3D file showing a sternum with sternal foramen and xiphoid foramen

== See also ==
- Sternum
- List of anatomical variation
