= Marginal artery =

Marginal artery can refer to:

- Marginal artery of the colon, also known as the artery of Drummond
- Right marginal branch of right coronary artery, a branch of the right coronary artery that follows the acute margin of the heart
- Left marginal artery, a branch of the circumflex artery, traveling along the left margin of heart
