= Sternopericardial ligaments =

Ligaments of the sternum and pericardium

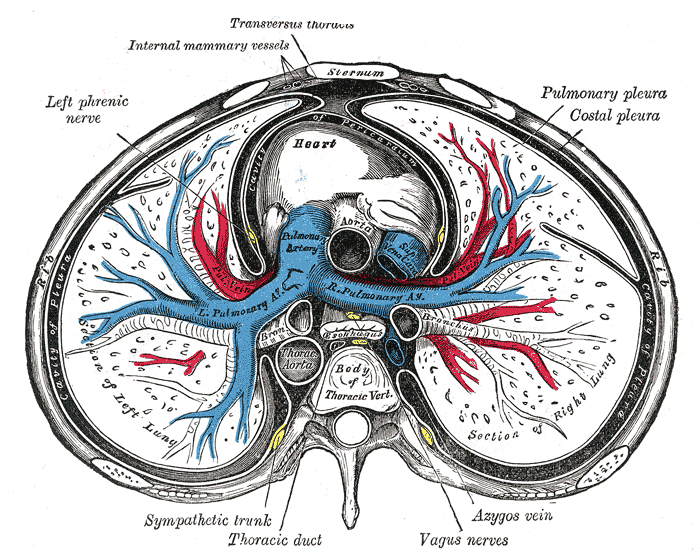
- transverse section of the thorax, showing the contents of the middle and the posterior mediastinum.

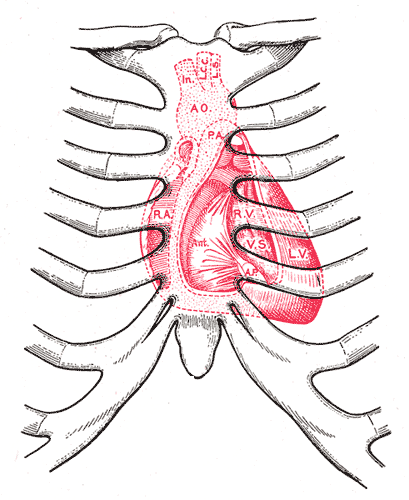
- Diagram showing relations of opened heart to front of thoracic wall.

Details

Identifiers
- Latin: ligamenta sternopericardiaca
- TA98: A12.1.08.003
- TA2: 3337
- FMA: 71429

The fibrous pericardium is attached to the posterior surface of the sternum by the superior and inferior sternopericardiac ligaments (sternopericardial ligaments); the upper passing to the manubrium, and the lower to the xiphoid process.
