= Foramen tympanicum =

Anatomical variation in the temporal bone

Details

Identifiers
- Latin: Foramen tympanicum

The foramen tympanicum, or also known as the foramen of Huschke, is an anatomical variation of the tympanic part of the temporal bone in humans resulting from a defect in normal ossification during the first five years of life. The structure was found in 4.6% to as high as 23% of the population.

== Structure ==
If present, the foramen tympanicum is located at the anteroinferior portion of the external auditory canal, locating posteromedial to the temporomandibular joint. The structure connects the external auditory canal to the infratemporal fossa. Reduction in thickness of the temporal bone may also occur in the same location. During development of the skull, the foramen tympanicum normally closes by the age of 5 years. The foramen, however, may persist in rare cases resulting in its presence in adults. The persistence of this foramen may be the result of abnormal mechanical forces during development of face and/or ossification abnormalities attributed to genetic factors.

== Clinical relevance ==
Persistence of the foramen tympanicum may also predispose the individual to the spread of infection or tumor from the external auditory canal to the infratemporal fossa or vice versa. It is associated with herniation of soft tissues from the temporomandibular joint into the external auditory meatus, and with formation of fistula between the parotid gland and the external auditory canal. During arthroscopy of the temporomandibular joint, the endoscope may inadvertently pass into the joint via the foramen, with resulting damage.
