= Axillary arch =

Muscular slip associated with latissimus dorsi muscle

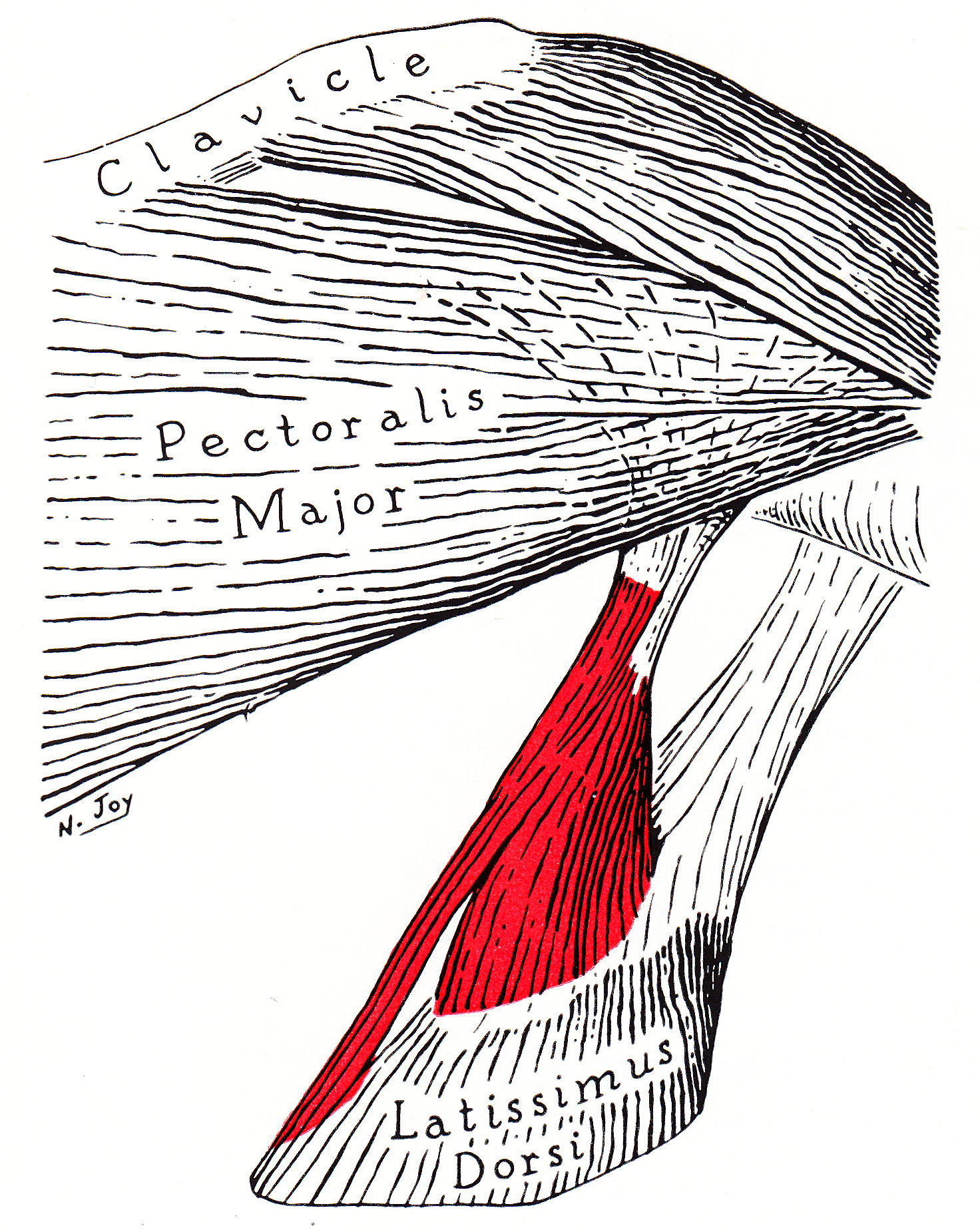
- Axillary arch highlighted in red.

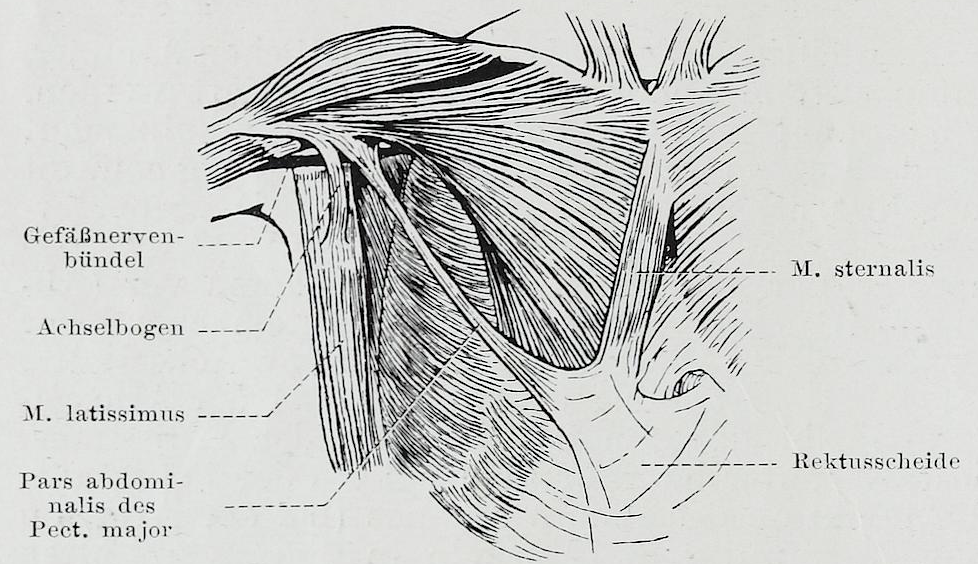
- Axillary arch labelled as 'achselbogen'.

Details
- Origin: Latissimus dorsi muscle
- Insertion: Humerus, Pectoralis major
- Artery: Lateral thoracic artery and subscapular artery
- Nerve: Lateral pectoral nerve

Identifiers
- Latin: arcus axillaris

The axillary arch is a variant of the latissimus dorsi muscle in humans. It is found as a slip of muscle or fascia extending between the latissimus dorsi muscle and the pectoralis major. There is considerable variation in the exact position of its origin and insertions as well as its blood and nerve supply. The arch may occur on one or both sides of the body. A meta-analysis revealed that the axillary arch had an overall prevalence of 5.3% of limbs.

The arch is considered to have no functional significance, although this is challenged by some authors. It plays a role in entrapment of nearby structures and may alter local anatomy if a dissection of the local area is needed during surgery. The arch appears to arise from the panniculus carnosus, a structure found in most non-primate mammals, and has similarities with muscles found in many animals. The axillary arch has several other names including Langer's axillary arch, the muscle of Langer, axillopectoral muscle, Achselbogen and pectorodorsalis muscle.

== Structure ==
The axillary arch is an arch-shaped anatomical variant of the latissimus dorsi muscle of the human back. Its shape varies, but its defining characteristics are its origin from the latissimus dorsi muscle, its insertion close to or on the upper anterior part of the humerus, and that it crosses the neurovascular bundle associated with the axillary nerve from dorsomedial to ventrolateral. Its size may vary from 7 to 10 cm (2.8 to 3.9 in) in length and 5–15 mm (0.2–0.6 in) in width. The axillary arch may be seen when the arm is abducted and the palms put on the back of the head. An impression can be seen on the medial side of the axilla.

=== Nerve supply ===
Most commonly the lateral pectoral nerve innervates the axillary arch, although instances have been found where the intercostobrachial nerve, the medial pectoral nerve and the thoracodorsal nerve provide the nervous supply.

=== Variation ===
The shape, size, insertion and origin of the arch can vary widely. The arch usually occurs on both sides of the body; but may also occur only on one side. The muscular component of the arch varies, with some arches seen to be purely fibrous. The origin can be a direct continuation of the latissimus dorsi muscle fibres, originate with the tendinous element of the latissimus dorsi, or be a mixture of the two types originating from both the muscle and the tendon.

The prevalence of the axillary arch in the European population is around 5.3%, but this varies considerably among different genetic groups; lower in the Turkish population and more prevalent in the Chinese population.

The axillary arch may insert into the tendon of the pectoralis major muscle, the fascia of the coracobrachialis muscle, or the fascia covering the biceps brachii muscle. Insertion into the pectoralis major muscle proper, the long head of the biceps brachii muscle, the coracoid process, the pectoralis minor muscle, the axillary fascia and to the bone at the crest of the greater tubercle of the humerus inserting distal to the insertion of the pectoralis major muscle have all been reported.

== Function ==
The axillary arch is considered to have no functional significance, although one small study of 22 participants has reported an increase in strength, endurance and motor control of the arm in women (but not men) with the arch as compared with those without; and an improvement in shoulder proprioception in both men and women.

== Clinical significance ==
There are several potential clinical consequences of the presence of an axillary arch including confusing the identification and palpation of enlarged or tumorous lymph nodes, the trapping of axillary structures including the axillary nerve and the axillary vein and causing potential problems in axillary surgery or breast reconstruction. There have also been reported instances of the axillary arch being involved in the development of deep vein thrombosis.

== History ==
The axillary arch muscle was first described by Bugnone in 1783 according to Pitzorno (1912) with Alexander Ramsay describing it as a novel variation during dissections performed in Edinburgh and London around 1793 by his own account of 1812. In 1846 Karl Langer wrote up an account of the axillary arch, although he initially only described it as a fibrous arch, and termed it the Achselbogen (German: Axillary arch). Langer later described the presence of a muscular slip associated with the arch in certain cases. Due to these publications Leo Testut used the term arc axillaire de Langer to refer to the muscular form of the arch, an association which has persisted.

== Other animals ==
Possible homologous structures in other species have been identified as the dorsoepitrochlearis muscle, the pectoralis quartus muscle or the panniculus carnosus. The dorsoepitrochlearis is an important climbing muscle in monkeys and apes where it has its origin in the tendinous region of the latissimus dorsi and extends down the arm as a superficial muscle.

The panniculus carnosus is a layer of striated muscle deep to the panniculus adiposus. Although absent in hominoids, the panniculus carnosus is common in non-hominoid primates and non-primate mammals. In lower mammals the area of the panniculus carnosus can be extensive, almost covering the entire body in the case of the short-beaked echidna. Several human muscles are considered discrete muscles originating from the panniculus carnosus, and some researchers classify the axillary arch as a sporadic vestigial muscle of this type.

== See also ==
List of anatomical variations
