= Mesenteric arteries =

Group of blood vessels

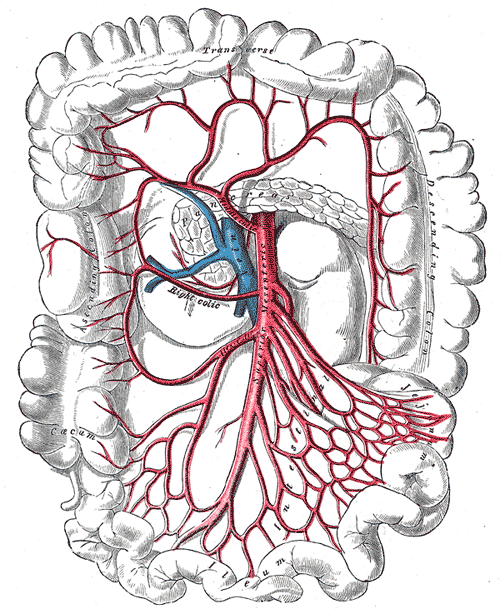
Superior mesenteric artery and its branches in humans

Inferior mesenteric artery and its branches in humans

The mesenteric arteries take blood from the aorta and distribute it to a large portion of the gastrointestinal tract.

Both the superior and inferior mesenteric arteries arise from the abdominal aorta. Each of these arteries travel through the mesentery, within which they branch several times before reaching the gut. In humans, many of these branches are named, but in smaller animals the branches are more variable. In some animals, including humans, branches of these arteries join with the marginal artery of the colon, which means that occlusion of one of the main arteries does not necessarily lead to the death of the part of the gut that it usually supplies.

The term mesenteric artery is also used to describe smaller branches of these vessels which, particularly in smaller animals, provide a significant source of vascular resistance. These branches have a dense innervation by sympathetic nerves, allowing the brain to control their diameter and hence the resistance to blood flow to the gut. This is of particular importance when blood flow is required elsewhere, such as in exercise or shock, where a large proportion of the blood is required to supply the needs of skeletal muscle; by constricting the smaller mesenteric vessels, the resistance of blood flow to the gut increases, and hence blood flows more readily to other organs.

== See also ==
- Superior mesenteric artery
- Inferior mesenteric artery
