= Episternal ossicles =

Type of small bone

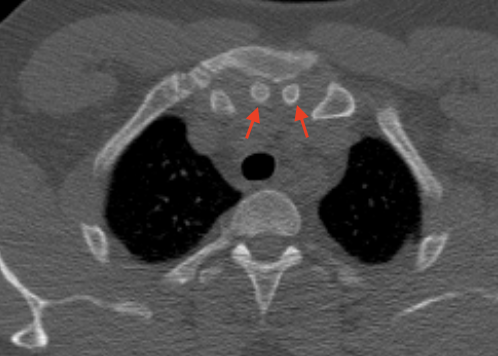
Axial computed tomography showing the episternal ossicles (red arrows)

Episternal ossicles (or suprasternal ossicles) are small bones that are sometimes present at the upper end of the chest bone. The prevalence of these ossicles is around 1.5%.

== Structure ==
The episternal ossicles are oval-shaped bones that are occasionally found at the superior and posterior border of the manubrium. The episternal ossicles were first described by Cobb in 1937. They may be present unilaterally or bilaterally. Its size ranges from 2–15 mm depending on individuals. These ossicles are asymptomatic and does not cause any harm, although it may be diagnosed as fracture, vascular ossification or calcified lymph nodes.

== See also ==
- Sternum
- List of anatomical variation
