= Linburg–Comstock variation =

Human anatomical variation

- Other names: Linburg–Comstock syndrome
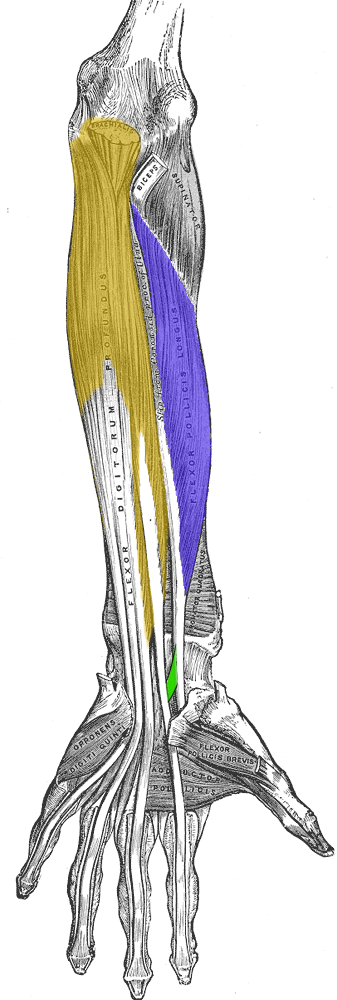
- Linburg and Comstock syndrome is seen as a tendinous connection (green) between flexor pollicis longus (purple) and flexor digitorum profundus (yellow).
- Specialty: Orthopedic surgery, plastic surgery

Linburg–Comstock variation is an occasional tendinous connection between the flexor pollicis longus and the flexor digitorum profundus of the index, the middle finger or both. It is found in around 21% of the population. It is an anatomical variation in humans, which may be viewed as a pathology if it causes symptoms. It was recognised as early as the 1800s, but was first described by Linburg and Comstock in 1979.

== Signs and symptoms ==
Although Linburg–Comstock variation remains asymptomatic, a number of case reports suggested that symptoms could develop after a forceful extension of the index finger with the thumb in a flexed position. Symptoms also develop from heavy and repetitive use of the wrist and forearm and can also develop in those who require fine and independent functionality of the fingers, such as musicians.

This abnormality is clinically evident when the patient is unable to flex the thumb without flexing the distal interphalangeal joint of the index or middle finger or vice versa.

Flexor tenosynovitis is a common finding in the patients with Linburg–Comstock syndrome. Another hypothesis is that anatomical variations, which in this case is an additional tendon slip, may act as space-occupying lesions and potentially contribute to carpal tunnel syndrome.

== Structure ==
=== Development ===
Linburg–Comstock variation and syndrome may result from phylogenetic differences between human and non-human primates. Phylogenetically, the flexor pollicis longus and the flexor digitorum profundus both originate from a common mesodermal mass. In non-human primates, there is only one flexor muscle for all the fingers, whereas in humans, the flexor pollicis longus becomes distinct. Linburg–Comstock syndrome may be viewed as an evolutionary persistent structure. It is still inconclusive whether or not the connection is congenital or acquired at a later time point in life.

=== Anatomy ===
Multiple types of the connection between the flexor pollicis longus and the flexor digitorum profundus were described:

- A tendinous connection between the flexor digitorum profundus of the index to the flexor pollicis longus
- A muscle with a bifurcated (split into two) tendon for the thumb and index finger
- A common muscle with five tendons for the thumb and the long fingers

== Diagnosis ==
The examiner passively restricts the flexion of the fingers while the examinee attempts to actively flex the thumb. A positive test is marked by restricted active thumb flexion with pain or cramping discomfort in the palmar and radial sides of the distal (lower) forearm or wrist. The magnetic resonance imaging (MRI) can confirm and localise Linburg and Comstock syndrome. As reported by Karalezli, magnetic resonance imaging was performed on all patients diagnosed with positive test, and there were tendinous connection in all cases.

== Treatment ==
Surgery may be performed by excising or splitting the tendinous connection to form two separate tendons, depending on the nature of the connection. Muscle belly associated with the symptoms may also be removed.

== Epidemiology ==
This variant occurred bilaterally (in both hands) in 14% and unilaterally in 31% (either in left or right hand) out of 194 patients as reported by the original study. Four cases were responsible for chronic tenosynovitis. A recent meta analysis reported that the connection is present in 21% of the population.
