= Panniculus carnosus =

Subcutaneous tissue

The panniculus carnosus is a part of the subcutaneous tissues in vertebrates. It is a layer of striated muscle which underlies the panniculus adiposus. In humans, the platysma muscle of the neck, palmaris brevis in the hand, and the dartos muscle in the scrotum are described as discrete muscles of the panniculus carnosus. Some of the muscles of facial expression in the head are likewise part of the panniculus carnosus. In other parts of the body, the layer is vestigial, and may be absent or may exist only as microscopic, disconnected fibers.

In other animals, the panniculus carnosus is more extensive. For example, the panniculus carnosus in the echidna nearly covers the animal's entire body, enabling it to change its shape to a certain degree, most characteristically by rolling into a ball in order to present its spines to a potential predator.
