= Transverse basilar cleft =

The transverse basilar cleft, also called a basilar transverse fissure or Saucer’s fissure, is a rare congenital anatomical variation of the basilar part of the occipital bone at the base of the skull. It consists of a transverse gap that partially or completely divides the bone near the pharyngeal tubercle. It is usually asymptomatic and may be discovered incidentally during imaging or examination of skeletal remains. Estimated prevalence of this variation is 4.2 per 1000.

== Structure ==
The basilar part of the occipital bone lies anterior to the foramen magnum and forms the lower portion of the clivus. A transverse basilar cleft may appear as a notch extending inward from one lateral margin, as paired lateral notches, or as a complete fissure separating anterior and posterior portions.

The embryological origin of the cleft remains uncertain. Proposed explanations include persistence of segmentation between embryonic occipital sclerotomes and incomplete union between proposed anterior and posterior ossification centres of the basioccipital.

== Clinical relevance ==
Most reported transverse basilar clefts are incidental findings. On radiographs, a cleft may resemble a fracture or a synchondrosis, making recognition of the variation relevant to interpretation of skull-base imaging. Computed tomography can demonstrate its location and extent. The presence of this cleft is associated with CHARGE syndrome, Cornelia de Lange syndrome, Chiari malformation and hemifacial microsomia.
