= Accessory soleus muscle =

Calf muscle duplication

Details

Identifiers
- Latin: Musculus soleus accessorius

The accessory soleus muscle is an accessory muscle of the calf which is rarely present in humans; it is, however, the most common accessory muscle of the ankle.

The muscle inserts on the anterior aspect of the soleus muscle or on the posterior aspect of the tibia or the muscles of the deep posterior compartment. It lies anterior to the calcaneal tendon and terminates on the calcaneal tendon or the superior or medial aspect of the calcaneus via fleshy fibers or a distinct tendon.

Present in approximately 3% (or 10%) of people, this muscle usually appears as a distant belly, medial to the Achilles tendon. Clinically, the accessory soleus may be associated with pain and edema during periods of prolonged exercise.
