= Sternal cleft =

- Other names: Sternum bifidum

Sternal clefts are rare congenital malformations that result from defective embryologic fusion of paired mesodermal bands in the ventral midline. They may be associated with other midline defects (as in pentalogy of Cantrell). It may also occur in isolation. Sternal cleft is treated by surgery in early life to avoid fixation leading to immobility.

== See also ==
- PHACE association
- List of cutaneous conditions
