= Palmaris profundus muscle =

Variant muscle of the forearm

Palmaris profundus
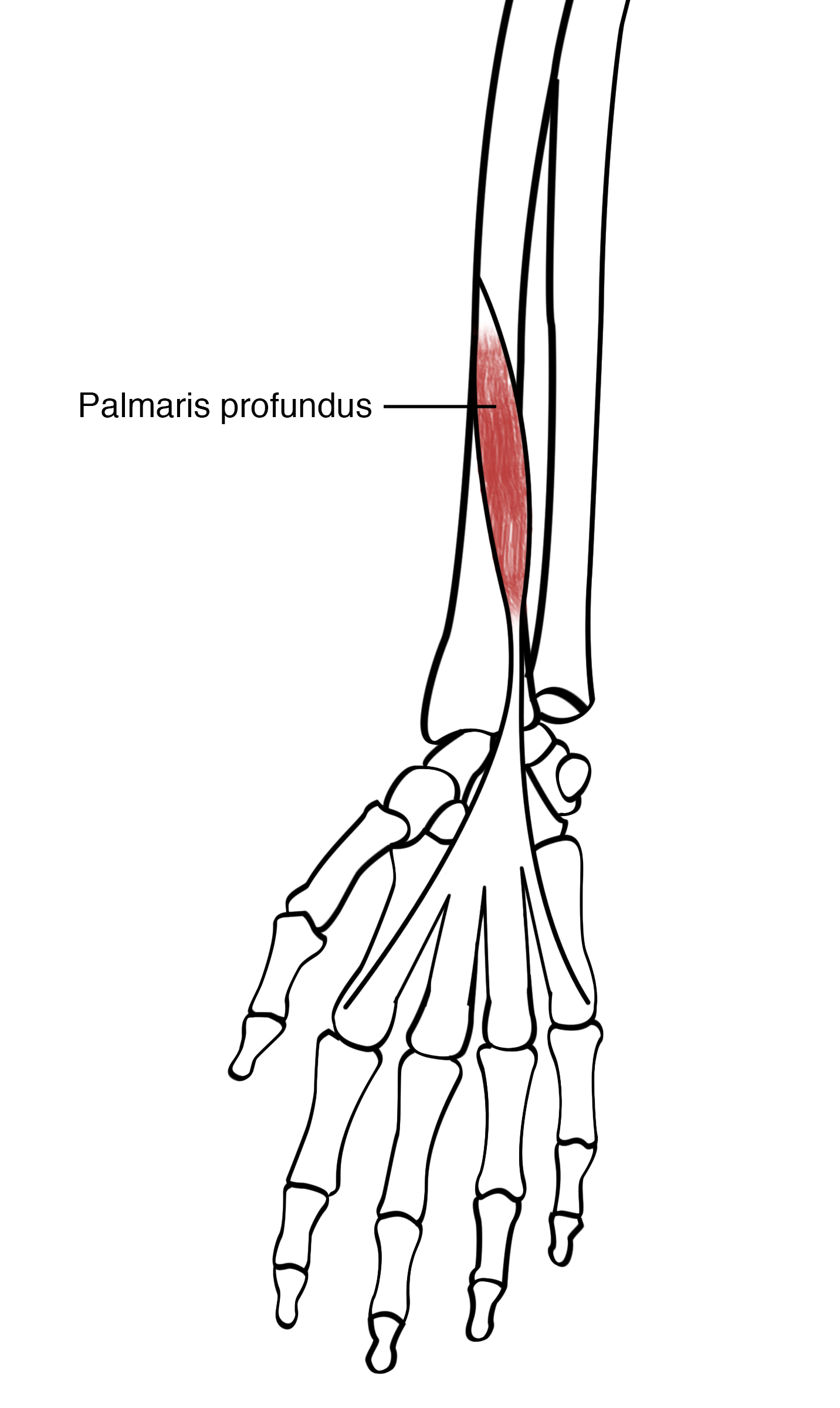
- Palmaris profundus muscle originates from the lateral edge of radius and inserts to palmar aponeurosis.

Details
- Origin: Lateral edge of radius, ulna, flexor digitorum superficialis or medial epicondyle of humerus
- Insertion: Palmar aponeurosis
- Artery: Ulnar artery
- Nerve: Median nerve, anterior interosseous nerve or ulnar nerve
- Actions: Wrist flexor

Identifiers
- Latin: Musculus palmaris profundus

Palmaris profundus (also known as musculus comitans nervi mediani or palmaris bitendinous) is a rare anatomical variant in the anterior compartment of forearm. It was first described in 1908. It is usually found incidentally in cadaveric dissection or surgery.

== Structure ==
Pirola et al. classified the muscle into subtypes depending on its origin: (1) from the radius, (2) from the flexor digitorum superficialis fascia, and (3) from the ulna. Though, other origins of the muscle were reported including the medial epicondyle of humerus, the palmaris longus and the flexor pollicis longus. It runs deep to the pronator teres and lateral to the flexor digitorum superficialis. Its tendon passes beneath the flexor retinaculum through the carpal tunnel before broadening out to insert to the deep part of palmar aponeurosis.

In many cases, the muscle is contained within the same fascial sheath as the median nerve. To indicate this association, the term musculus comitans nervi mediani is often used. It can also be referred to as the palmaris bitendinosus when originating from the palmaris longus. It can be considered a variation of the palmaris longus, however, it may exist in addition to the palmaris longus. If both of them coexist, the aberrant palmaris profundus tends to be the deeper one.

Nerve supply to the palmaris profundus varies. Innervations by the median nerve, anterior interosseous nerve or the ulnar nerve were reported.

Function of the palmaris profundus is similar to the palmaris longus. It is a flexor of the wrist.

== Clinical significance ==
The presence of the palmaris profundus is often associated with median nerve compression and carpal tunnel syndrome as available space for the median nerve decreases due to the presence of an additional tendon. It may also complicate the surgical release of the carpal tunnel.

It may compress the anterior interosseous nerve, a motor branch of the median nerve, causing a condition called anterior interosseous nerve syndrome.

== See also ==
- Palmaris longus muscle
- List of anatomical variations
- Anterior compartment of forearm
