= Marginal artery of the colon =

Human artery

- Frontal view of the abdominal aorta and the territory supplied by the inferior mesenteric artery. The arteries on the right side (left side of image) arise from the superior mesenteric artery (SMA). The marginal artery (not labeled) connects the middle colic artery (a branch of the SMA) to the left colic artery (a branch of the IMA).

- Colonic blood supply (Marginal artery is #9)

Details
- Source: Superior mesenteric artery, inferior mesenteric artery
- Supplies: Large intestine

Identifiers
- Latin: arteria marginalis coli
- TA98: A12.2.12.068
- TA2: 4266
- FMA: 14824

In human anatomy, the marginal artery of the colon, also known as the marginal artery of Drummond, the artery of Drummond, and simply as the marginal artery, is an artery that connects the inferior mesenteric artery with the superior mesenteric artery. It is sometimes absent, as an anatomical variant.

== Structure ==
The marginal artery runs in the mesentery close to the large intestine as part of the vascular arcade that connects the superior mesenteric artery and the inferior mesenteric artery. It provides an effective anastomosis between these two arteries for the large intestine.

=== Variation ===
The marginal artery is almost always present, and its absence should be considered a variant.

== Clinical significance ==
=== Removal of the inferior mesenteric artery ===
Along with branches of the internal iliac arteries, it is usually sufficiently large to supply the oxygenated blood to the large intestine. This means that the inferior mesenteric artery does not have to be re-implanted (re-attached) into the repaired abdominal aorta in abdominal aortic aneurysm repair.

=== Arc of Riolan ===
The Arc of Riolan (Riolan's arcade, Arch of Riolan, Haller's anastomosis), also known as the meandering mesenteric artery, is another vascular arcade present in the colonic mesentery that connect the proximal middle colic artery with a branch of the left colic artery. This artery is found low in the mesentery, near the root. In the setting of chronic ischemic colitis, both the marginal artery and the meandering mesenteric artery may be enlarged significantly, and may provide significant blood flow to the ischemic colonic segment.

== History ==
The marginal artery is also known as the marginal artery of Drummond. It was named after Sir David Drummond (1852-1932), an Anglo-Irish physician.

== See also ==
- Marginal branch of the right coronary artery, sometimes referred to as the marginal artery.
- Marginal artery (disambiguation)
