= Sternum =

Flat bone in the middle front part of the rib cage

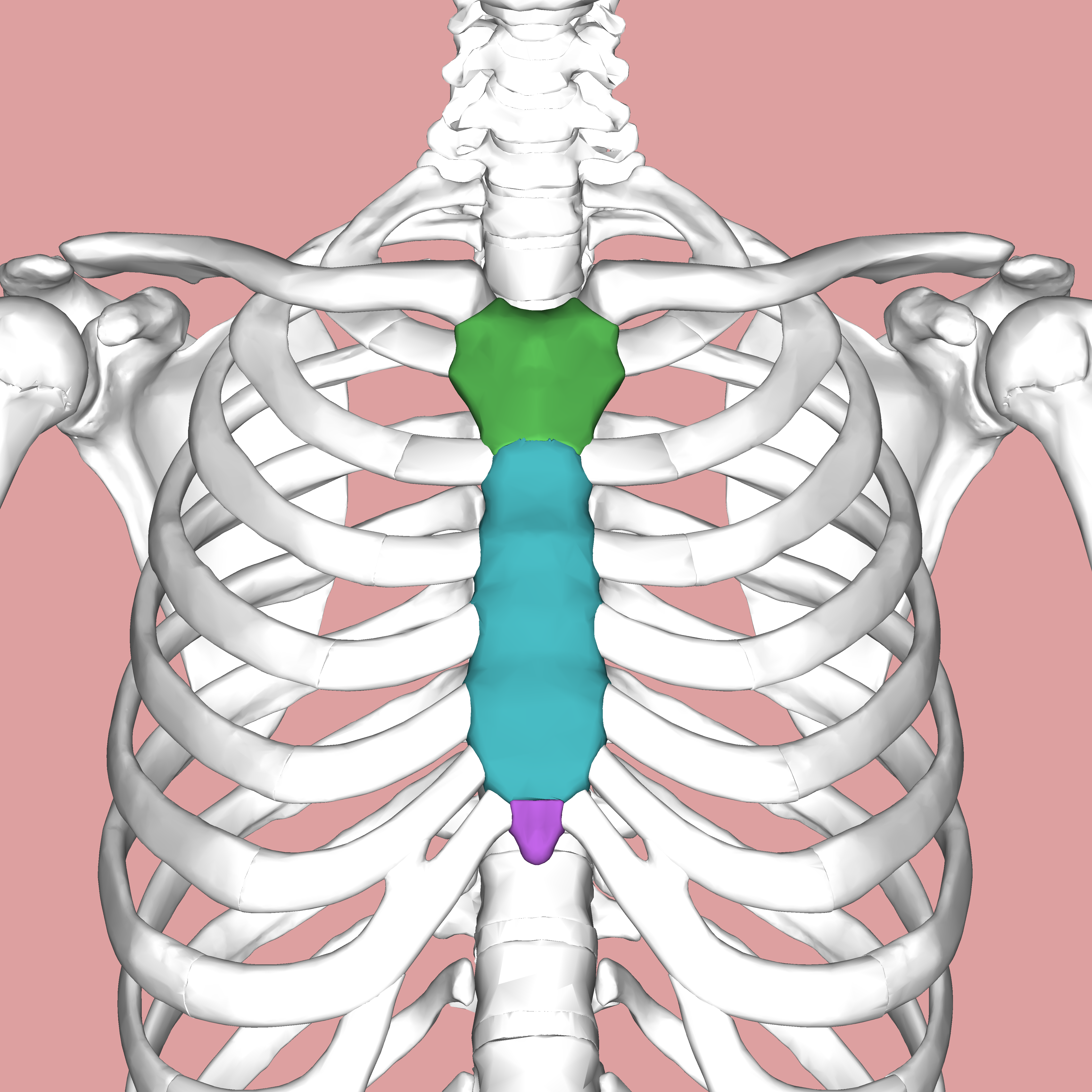
- Parts of the sternum: manubrium (green), body (blue), xiphoid process (purple)

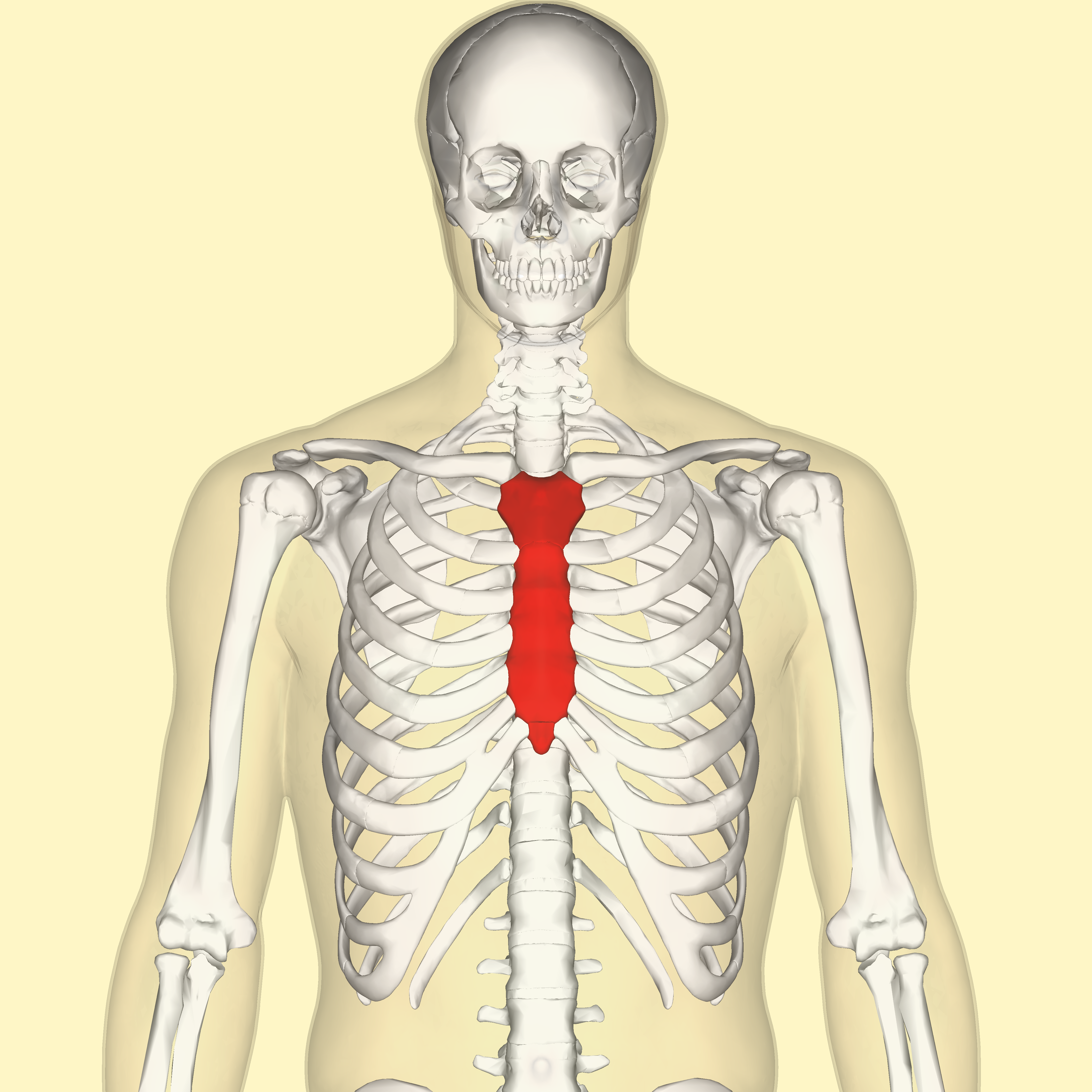
- Position of the sternum (red)

Details

Identifiers
- Latin: sternum
- MeSH: D013249
- TA98: A02.3.03.001
- TA2: 1129
- FMA: 7485

The sternum (pl.: sternums or sterna) or breastbone is a long flat bone located in the central part of the chest. It connects to the ribs via cartilage and forms the front of the rib cage, thus helping to protect the heart, lungs, and major blood vessels from injury. Shaped roughly like a necktie, it is one of the largest and longest flat bones of the body. Its three regions are the manubrium, the body, and the xiphoid process. The word sternum originates from Ancient Greek στέρνον (stérnon) 'chest'.

== Structure ==
The sternum is a narrow, flat bone, forming the middle portion of the front of the chest. The top of the sternum supports the clavicles (collarbones) and its edges join with the costal cartilages of the first two pairs of ribs. The inner surface of the sternum is also the attachment of the sternopericardial ligaments. Its top is also connected to the sternocleidomastoid muscle. The sternum consists of three main parts, listed from the top:

- Manubrium
- Body (gladiolus)
- Xiphoid process

In its natural position, the sternum is angled obliquely, downward and forward. It is slightly convex in front and concave behind; broad above, shaped like a "T", becoming narrowed at the point where the manubrium joins the body, after which it again widens a little to below the middle of the body, and then narrows to its lower extremity. It is usually longer in the male than in the female.

=== Manubrium ===
Shape of manubrium

The manubrium (Latin for 'handle') is the broad upper (superior) part of the sternum. It has a quadrangular shape, narrowing from the top, which gives it four borders. The suprasternal notch (jugular notch) is located in the middle at the upper broadest part of the manubrium. This notch can be felt between the two clavicles. On either side of this notch are the right and left clavicular notches.

The manubrium joins with the body of the sternum, the clavicles and the cartilages of the first 1.5 pairs of ribs. The joint between the manubrium and the body of the sternum (the manubriosternal joint) is the location of the sternal angle. Which is the angle between the manubrium and the sternum and can often be palpitated on surface of the body.

The manubrium's inferior border is oval and rough, is covered with a thin layer of cartilage for articulation with the body. The lateral borders are each marked above by a depression for the first costal cartilage, and below by a small facet, which, with a similar facet on the upper angle of the body, forms a notch for the reception of the costal cartilage of the second rib. Between the depression for the first costal cartilage and the demi-facet for the second is a narrow, curved edge, which slopes from above downward towards the middle. Also, the superior sternopericardial ligament attaches the pericardium to the posterior side of the manubrium.

=== Body ===
3D illustration of the body of sternum.

The body, or gladiolus, is the longest sternal part. It is flat and considered to have only a front and back surface. It is flat on the front, directed upward and forward, and marked by three transverse ridges which cross the bone opposite the third, fourth, and fifth articular depressions. The pectoralis major attaches to it on either side. At the junction of the third and fourth parts of the body is occasionally seen an orifice, the sternal foramen, of varying size and form. The posterior surface, slightly concave, is also marked by three transverse lines, less distinct, however, than those in front; from its lower part, on either side, the transversus thoracis takes origin.

The sternal angle is located at the point where the body joins the manubrium. The sternal angle can be felt at the point where the sternum projects farthest forward. However, in some people the sternal angle is concave or rounded. During physical examinations, the sternal angle is a useful landmark because the second rib attaches here.

Each outer border, at its superior angle, has a small facet, which with a similar facet on the manubrium, forms a cavity for the cartilage of the second rib; below this are four angular depressions which receive the cartilages of the third, fourth, fifth, and sixth ribs. The inferior angle has a small facet, which, with a corresponding one on the xiphoid process, forms a notch for the cartilage of the seventh rib. These articular depressions are separated by a series of curved interarticular intervals, which diminish in length from above downward, and correspond to the intercostal spaces. Most of the cartilages belonging to the true ribs, articulate with the sternum at the lines of junction of its primitive component segments. This is well seen in some other vertebrates, where the parts of the bone remain separated for longer.

The upper border is oval and articulates with the manubrium, at the sternal angle. The lower border is narrow, and articulates with the xiphoid process.

=== Xiphoid process ===
3D illustration of the xiphoid process.

Located at the inferior end of the sternum, is the pointed xiphoid process. Improperly performed chest compressions during cardiopulmonary resuscitation can cause the xiphoid process to snap off, driving it into the liver which can cause a fatal hemorrhage.

The sternum is composed of highly vascular tissue, covered by a thin layer of compact bone which is thickest in the manubrium between the articular facets for the clavicles. The inferior sternopericardial ligament attaches the pericardium to the posterior xiphoid process.

=== Joints ===
The cartilages of the top five ribs join with the sternum at the sternocostal joints. The right and left clavicular notches articulate with the right and left clavicles, respectively. The costal cartilage of the second rib articulates with the sternum at the sternal angle making it easy to locate.

The transversus thoracis muscle is innervated by one of the intercostal nerves and superiorly attaches at the posterior surface of the lower sternum. Its inferior attachment is the internal surface of costal cartilages two through six and works to depress the ribs.

=== Development ===
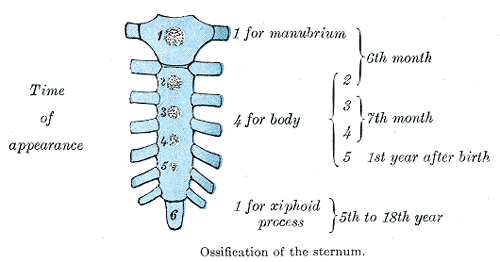
Figure 4 Ossification

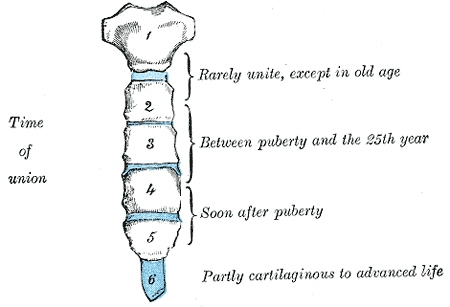
Figure 5

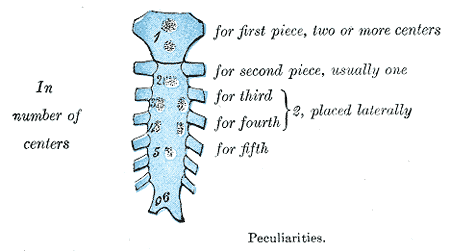
Figure 6 Peculiarities

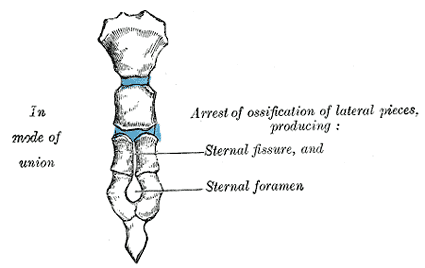
Figure 7

The sternum develops from two cartilaginous bars one on the left and one on the right, connected with the cartilages of the ribs on each side. These two bars fuse together along the middle to form the cartilaginous sternum which is ossified from six centers: one for the manubrium, four for the body, and one for the xiphoid process.

The ossification centers appear in the intervals between the articular depressions for the costal cartilages, in the following order: in the manubrium and first piece of the body, during the sixth month of fetal life; in the second and third pieces of the body, during the seventh month of fetal life; in its fourth piece, during the first year after birth; and in the xiphoid process, between the fifth and eighteenth years.

The centers make their appearance at the upper parts of the segments, and proceed gradually downward. To these may be added the occasional existence of two small episternal centers, which make their appearance one on either side of the jugular notch; they are probably vestiges of the episternal bone of the monotremata and lizards.

Occasionally some of the segments are formed from more than one center, the number and position of which vary [Fig. 6]. Thus, the first piece may have two, three, or even six centers.

When two are present, they are generally situated one above the other, the upper being the larger; the second piece has seldom more than one; the third, fourth, and fifth pieces are often formed from two centers placed laterally, the irregular union of which explains the rare occurrence of the sternal foramen [Fig. 7], or of the vertical fissure which occasionally intersects this part of the bone constituting the malformation known as fissura sterni; these conditions are further explained by the manner in which the cartilaginous sternum is formed.

More rarely still the upper end of the sternum may be divided by a fissure. Union of the various centers of the body begins about puberty, and proceeds from below upward [Fig. 5]; by the age of 25 they are all united. Sternum development is completed earlier in females than in males.

The xiphoid process may become joined to the body before the age of thirty, but this occurs more frequently after forty; on the other hand, it sometimes remains ununited in old age. In advanced life the manubrium is occasionally joined to the body by bone. When this takes place, however, the bony tissue is generally only superficial, the central portion of the intervening cartilage remaining unossified.

The body of the sternum is formed by the fusion of four segments called sternebrae.

=== Variations ===
In 2.5–13.5% of the population, a foramen known as sternal foramen may be presented at the lower third of the sternal body. In extremely rare cases, multiple foramina may be observed. Fusion of the manubriosternal joint also occurs in around 5% of the population. Small ossicles known as episternal ossicles may also be present posterior to the superior end of the manubrium. Another variant called suprasternal tubercle is formed when the episternal ossicles fuse with the manubrium.

== Clinical significance ==
=== Bone marrow biopsy ===
Because the sternum contains bone marrow, it is sometimes used as a site for bone marrow biopsy. In particular, patients with a high BMI (obese or grossly overweight) may present with excess tissue that makes access to traditional marrow biopsy sites such as the pelvis difficult.

=== Sternal opening ===
A somewhat rare congenital disorder of the sternum sometimes referred to as an anatomical variation is a sternal foramen, a single round hole in the sternum that is present from birth and usually is off-centered to the right or left, commonly forming in the 2nd, 3rd, and 4th segments of the breastbone body. Congenital sternal foramina can often be mistaken for bullet holes. They are usually without symptoms but can be problematic if acupuncture in the area is intended.

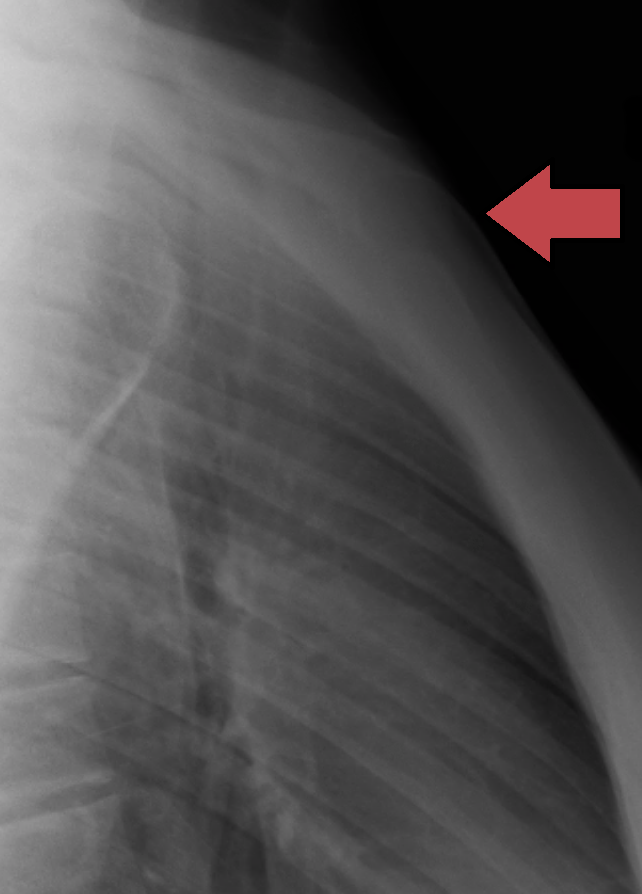
Manubrium sternal dislocation

=== Fractures ===
Fractures of the sternum are uncommon. They may result from trauma, such as when a driver's chest is forced into the steering column of a car in a car accident. A fracture of the sternum is usually a comminuted fracture. The most common site of sternal fractures is at the sternal angle. Some studies reveal that repeated punches or continual beatings, sometimes called "breastbone punches", to the sternum area have also caused fractured sternums. Those are known to have occurred in contact sports such as hockey and football. Sternal fractures are frequently associated with underlying injuries such as pulmonary contusions, or bruised lung tissue.

=== Dislocation ===
A manubriosternal dislocation is rare and usually caused by severe trauma. It may also result from minor trauma where there is a precondition of arthritis.

=== Sternotomy ===
The breastbone is sometimes cut open (a median sternotomy) to gain access to the thoracic contents when performing cardiothoracic surgery. Surgical fixation of sternotomy is achieved through the use of either wire cerclage or a plate and screw technique. The incidence of sternotomy complications falls within the narrow range of 0.5% to 5%. Nevertheless, these complications can have severe consequences, including increased mortality rates, the need for reoperation, and a mortality rate as high as 40%. Such complications often entail issues like dehiscence and sternal non-union, primarily stemming from lateral forces exerted during post-operative activities such as coughing and sneezing.

=== Resection ===
The sternum can be totally removed (resected) as part of a radical surgery, usually to surgically treat a malignancy, either with or without a mediastinal lymphadenectomy (Current Procedural Terminology codes # 21632 and # 21630, respectively).

=== Bifid sternum or sternal cleft ===
A bifid sternum is an extremely rare congenital abnormality caused by the fusion failure of the sternum. This condition results in sternal cleft which can be observed at birth without any symptom.

== Other animals ==
The sternum, in vertebrate anatomy, is a flat bone that lies in the middle front part of the rib cage. It is endochondral in origin. It probably first evolved in early tetrapods as an extension of the pectoral girdle; it is not found in fish. In amphibians and reptiles, it is typically a shield-shaped structure, often composed entirely of cartilage. It is absent in both turtles and snakes. In birds, it is a relatively large bone and typically bears an enormous projecting keel to which the flight muscles are attached. Only in mammals does the sternum take on the elongated, segmented form seen in humans.

=== Arthropods ===
In arthropods, a sternum is the ventral part of a segment of thorax or abdomen.

== Etymology ==
English sternum is a translation of Ancient Greek στέρνον, sternon. The Greek writer Homer used the term στέρνον to refer to the male chest, and the term στῆθος, stithos to refer to the chest of both sexes. The Greek physician Hippocrates used στέρνον to refer to the chest, and στῆθος to the breastbone. The Greek physician Galen was the first to use στέρνον in the present meaning of breastbone.

The sternum as the solid bony part of the chest can be related to Ancient Greek στερεός/στερρός, (stereós/sterrós), meaning firm or solid. The English term breastbone is actually more like the Latin os pectoris, derived from classical Latin os, bone and pectus, chest or breast. Confusingly, pectus is also used in classical Latin as breastbone.

== Additional images ==
Position of sternum (shown in red). Animation.

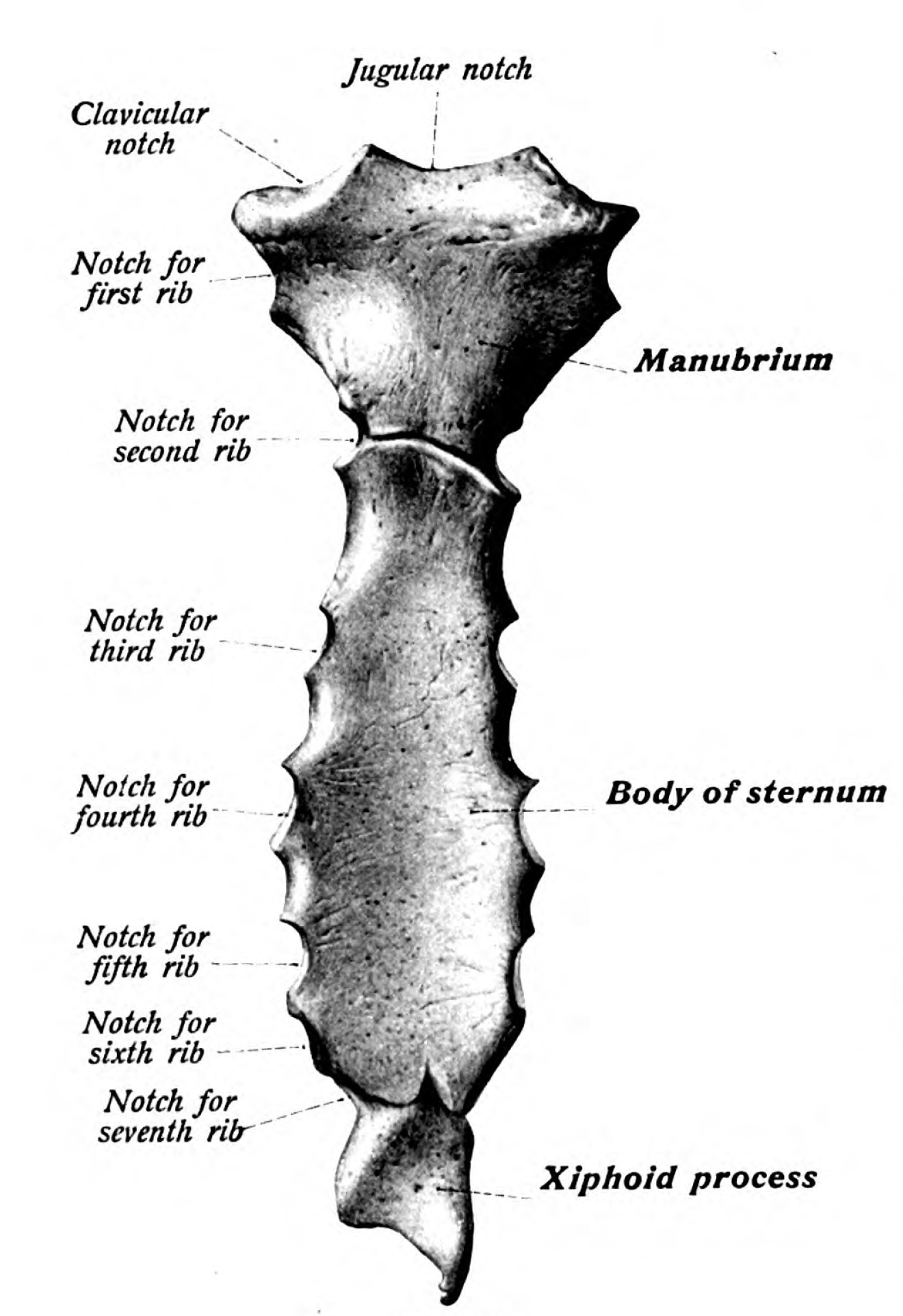
Sternum seen posteriorly

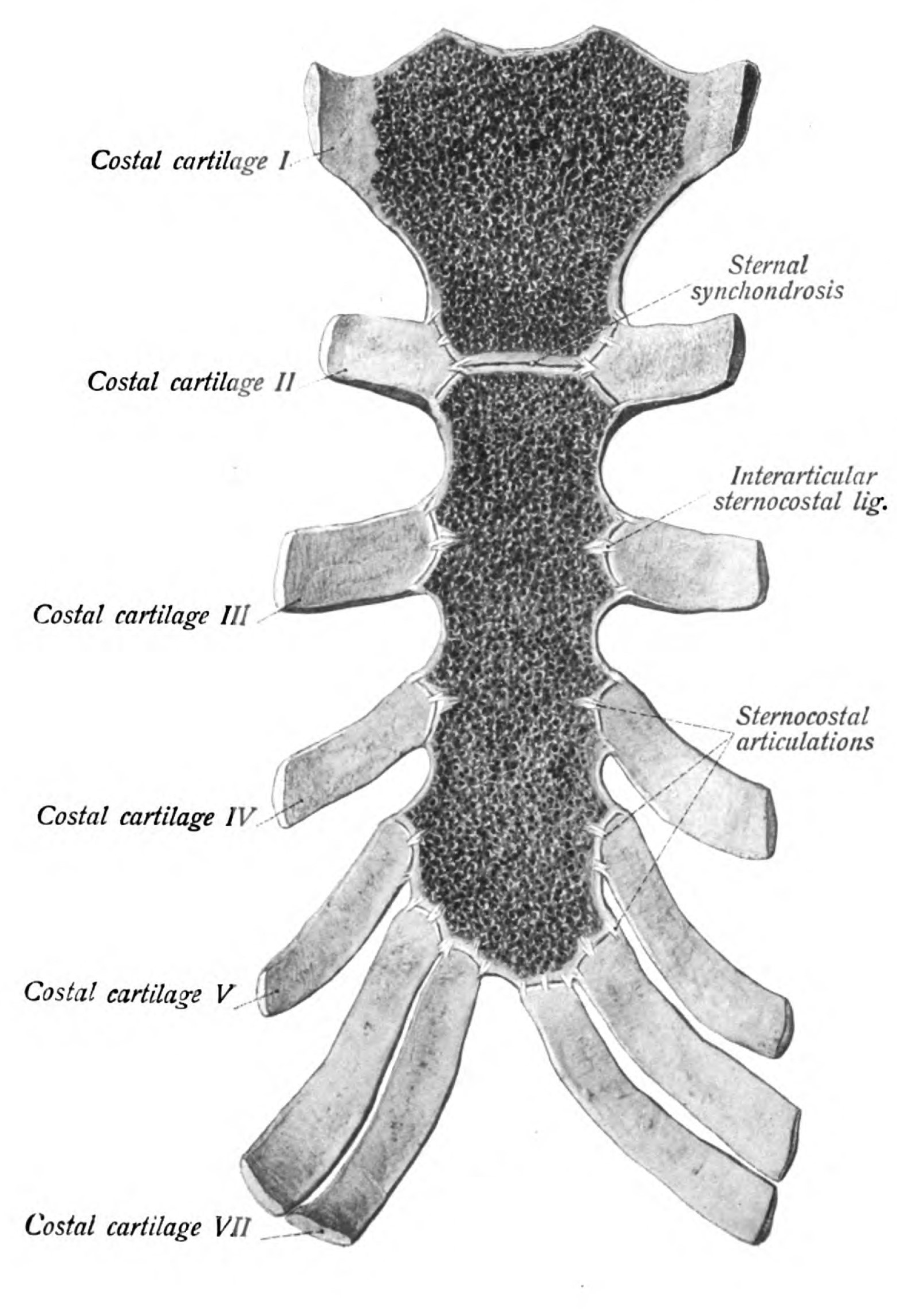
Sternum cut along the frontal plane showing interior of the bone

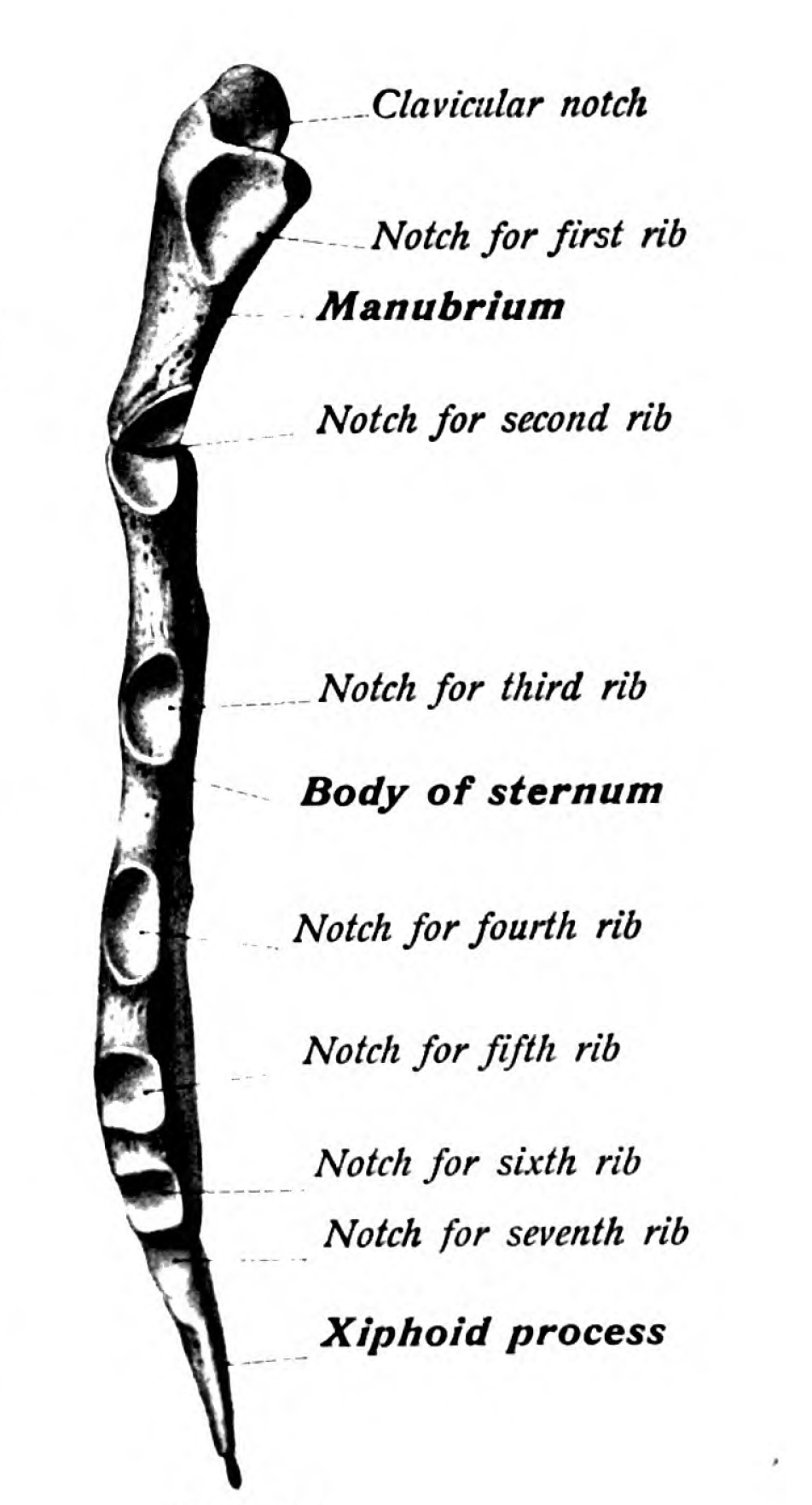
Sternum, lateral aspect

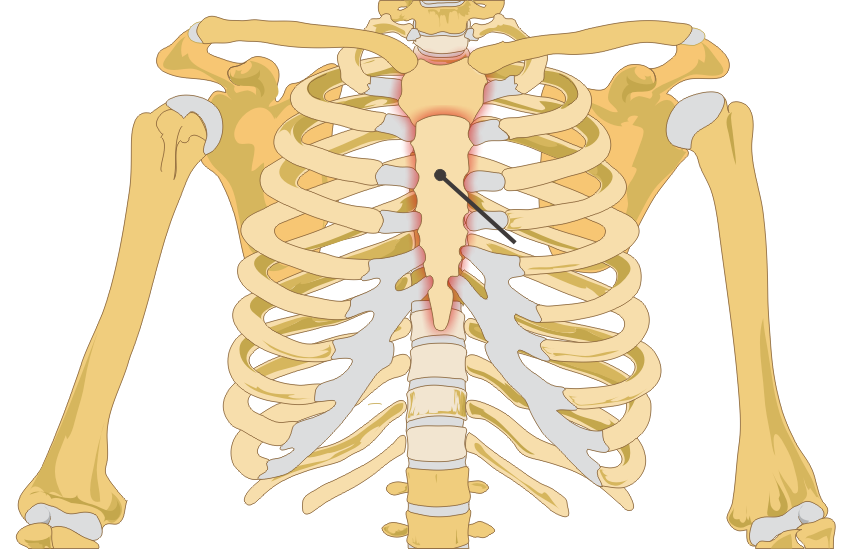
Position of the sternum the thoracic cage

Computer-generated image of ribcage turntable highlighting the sternum

Sternum anatomy

== See also ==
- Pectus carinatum
- Pectus excavatum
