= Trigeminal artery =

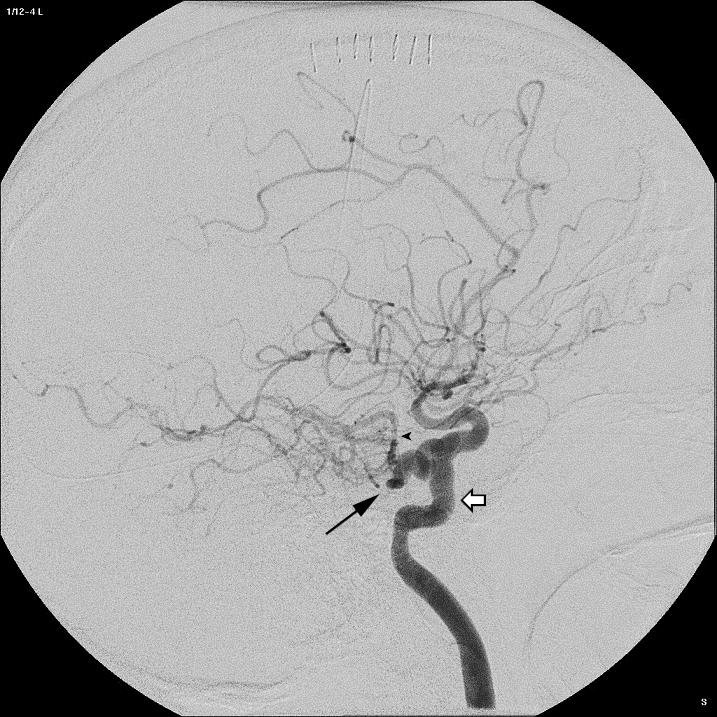
Angiogram demonstrating persistent trigeminal artery, as indicated by the black arrow.

The trigeminal artery is an artery that supplies the basilar artery with blood during human embryonic development. Normally, the trigeminal artery involutes after the formation of the posterior communicating artery. However, in some cases, the artery persists into adulthood and can cause medical complications, including intracranial aneurysms.

== Normal development ==
The trigeminal artery arises from the primitive internal carotid artery during development, when the embryo is approximately 6 weeks old. The trigeminal artery then anastomoses with the basilar artery. At this point in development, the trigeminal artery serves as the main blood supply for the hindbrain, as other vessels in the region have yet to mature. As the internal carotid artery branches more caudally to form the posterior communicating artery, the trigeminal artery becomes less important in supplying blood and ultimately involutes. The time period from the initial development of the artery to its ultimate involution is only 7 to 10 days; if the artery has not involuted at the end of this period it persists into adulthood.

== Persistent trigeminal artery ==
In around 0.1 to 0.6% of individuals, as sampled by magnetic resonance angiography, the trigeminal artery fails to involute and remains in the adult brain, in a condition called persistent trigeminal artery. This condition is more common in women than in men, with approximately 1.8 times as many women having the condition. Knowledge of a persistent trigeminal artery may be important in certain brain surgeries, as the condition is rare and an accidental cut to the artery could lead to hemorrhage. Although the discovery of a persistent trigeminal artery is sometimes an incidental finding, its presence is also associated with various pathological conditions, and must therefore be considered carefully when diagnosing these conditions.

There are 3 types of persistent trigeminal artery (PTA):

Saltzman Type 1: PTA supplies the distal vertebrobasilar arteries. In this instance, the posterior communicating artery and the caudal basilar artery is either absent or hypoplastic. There are also hypoplastic distal vertebral arteries.

Saltzman Type 2: The PTA supplies the superior cerebellar artery while the posterior cerebral artery is supplied by the posterior communicating artery

Saltzman Type 3: The PTA does not join the basilar artery but rather terminates as the superior cerebellar artery (type 3A); Anterior inferior cerebellar artery (3B) and posterior inferior cerebellar artery (3C)

=== Associated conditions ===
A persistent trigeminal artery is associated with an increased risk of aneurysm, though some studies have suggested that this finding may be an effect of selection bias, as most individuals do not undergo the tests necessary to identify the condition. Persistent trigeminal artery has been identified as a rare cause of trigeminal neuralgia, with 2.2% prevalence of persistent trigeminal artery among trigeminal neuralgia patients. Surgery to move the persistent trigeminal artery away from the trigeminal nerve has been successful in treating the trigeminal neuralgia in some cases. In some cases, presence of a persistent trigeminal artery concurs with hypoplasia of the basilar artery, in which case the internal carotid artery is responsible for most blood flow to the upper pons, cerebellum, midbrain, and parts of the temporal and occipital lobes, meaning that anything disrupting blood flow in the internal carotid artery could lead to ischemia in these regions. In addition, persistent trigeminal artery has been associated with vertebrobasilar insufficiency, brainstem ischemia, and carotid cavernous fistulae.
