= Xiphoid process =

Small bony extension of the lower part of the sternum

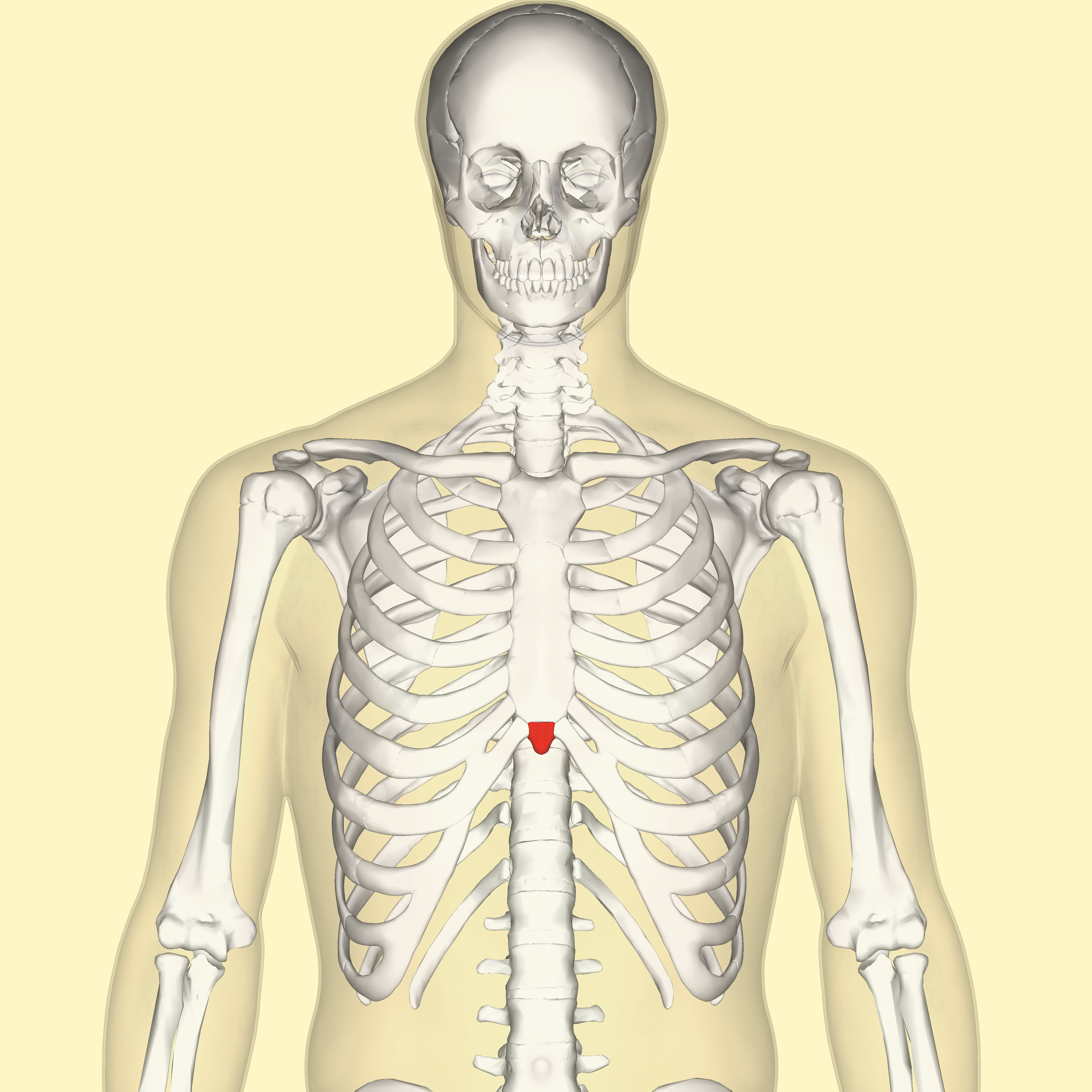
- Position of the xiphoid process (shown in red)

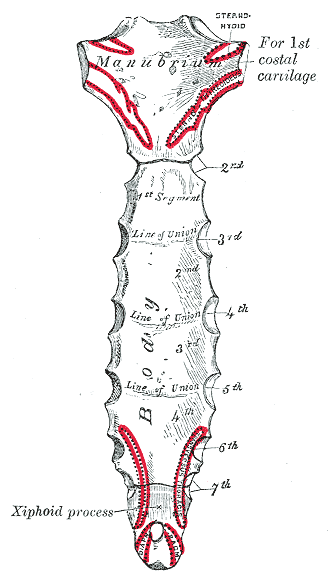
- Posterior surface of sternum. (Xiphoid process labeled at bottom.)

Details

Identifiers
- Latin: processus xiphoideus
- MeSH: D014989
- TA98: A02.3.03.007
- TA2: 1135
- FMA: 7488

The xiphoid process (/ˈzɪfɔɪd/), also referred to as the ensiform process, xiphisternum, or metasternum, constitutes a small cartilaginous process (extension) located in the inferior segment of the sternum, typically ossified in adult humans. Both the Greek-derived term xiphoid and its Latin equivalent, ensiform, connote a "swordlike" or "sword-shaped" morphology.

== Structure ==
The xiphoid process is anatomically situated at the level of the 9th thoracic vertebra (T9) and corresponds to the T7 dermatome.

=== Development ===
In neonates and young infants, particularly smaller infants, the tip of the xiphoid process may be seen as a palpable lump situated just below the sternal notch. Between the ages of 15 and 29, the xiphoid process typically undergoes fusion with the body of the sternum through a fibrous joint. Unlike the synovial articulation of major joints, this joint does not permit movement. Ossification of the xiphoid process typically occurs around the age of 40.

=== Variation ===
The xiphoid process may exhibit natural bifurcation or, in some instances, perforation (referred to as a xiphoidal foramen). These morphological variations are hereditary, which can facilitate the categorization of family members in addressing burial remains. These morphological differences carry no health implications; they simply represent variances in form.

=== Other animals ===
In birds, the xiphoid process is an elongated structure, often following the direction of the keel.

== Function ==
Similar to how the first seven ribs articulate with the sternum, the cartilage within the celiac plexus attaches to the xiphoid process, reinforcing it, and indirectly connecting the costal cartilage to the sternum. The xiphoid process plays a role in the attachment of many muscles, including the abdominal diaphragm, a muscle necessary for normal breathing. Additionally, it serves as an attachment point for the rectus abdominis muscles, commonly known as the "abs."

== Clinical significance ==
During chest compressions in cardiopulmonary resuscitation (CPR), it is possible to fracture or dislodge the xiphoid process, potentially leading to punctures or lacerations of the diaphragm. Furthermore, inadvertent liver puncture resulting in life-threatening internal bleeding can occur.

Xiphoidalgia (xiphodynia) represents a distinctive syndrome characterized by sternum-related pain and tenderness. While some sources categorize this disorder as uncommon, others suggest it may be relatively prevalent but overlooked by medical professionals. Xiphoidalgia is a musculoskeletal ailment capable of producing an array of symptoms that may mimic various common abdominal and thoracic disorders and diseases.

Symptoms associated with xiphoidalgia may include abdominal pain, chest discomfort, nausea, and radiating pain extending to the back, neck, and shoulders. Activities such as lifting heavy objects or chest trauma may precipitate this musculoskeletal ailment, and symptoms may intensify with bending or twisting. Common therapeutic approaches include anesthetic and steroid injections. The earliest documented case dates back to 1712.

Beyond age 40, individuals may become aware of their partially ossified xiphoid process and potentially misinterpret it as an abnormality.

In the context of pericardiocentesis, a medical procedure involving the aspiration of fluid from the pericardium of the heart, the xiphoid process often serves as an anatomical landmark for guiding the procedure.

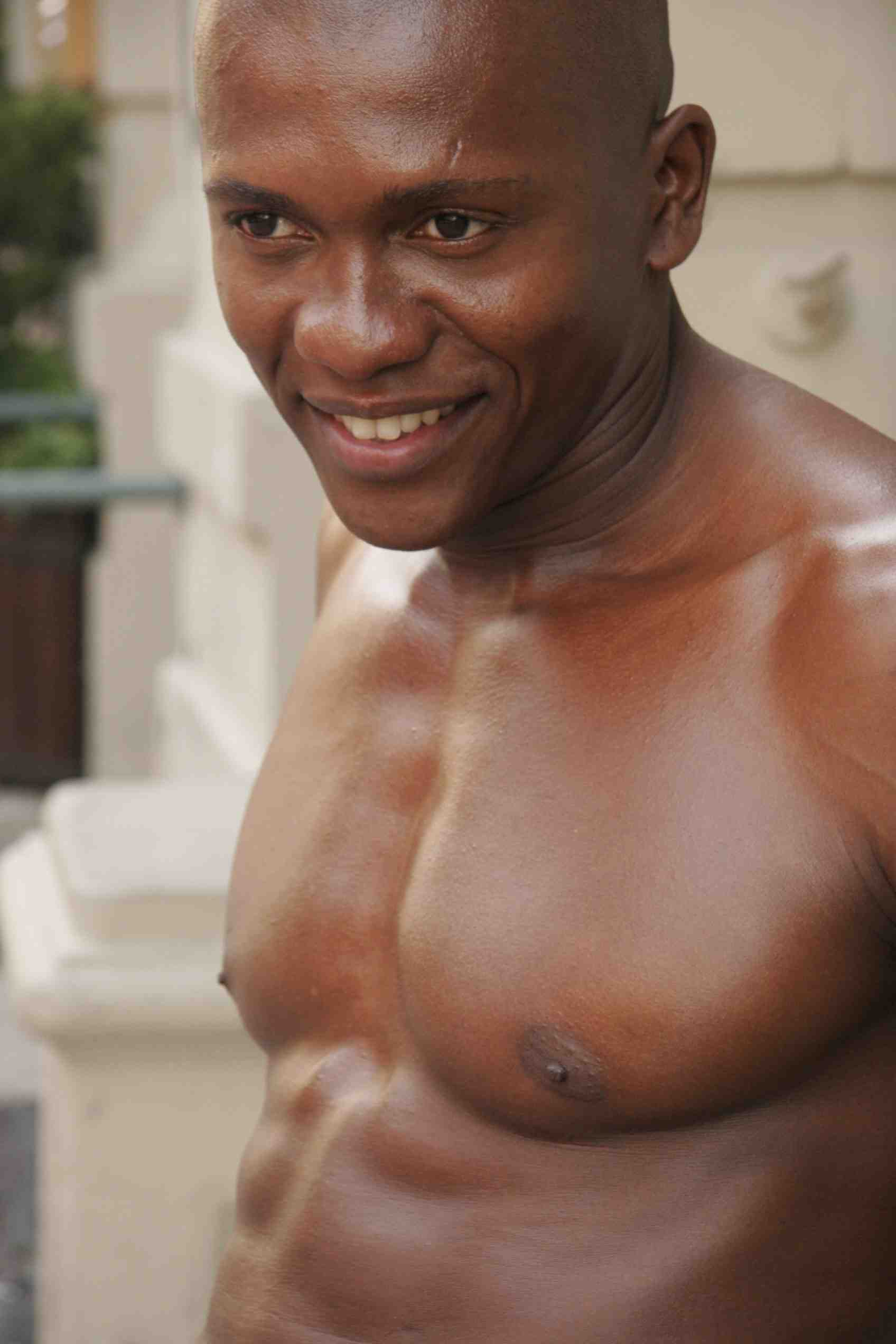
Substernal fossa as superficial pendant of xiphoid process

== Etymology ==
The term xiphoid originates from the Greek word xiphos, which means 'straight sword', bearing a resemblance to the process's tip. The Latin equivalent, processus xiphoides, translates to the xiphoid process. The writings of the Greek physician Galen refer to Os xyphoides, a translation of the Greek phrase ξιφοειδές ὀστοῦν. In this context, os in Classical Latin and ὀστοῦν in Ancient Greek both denote 'bone', while ξιφοειδές signifies 'sword-shaped'.

== Additional images ==
Position of xiphoid process (shown in red)

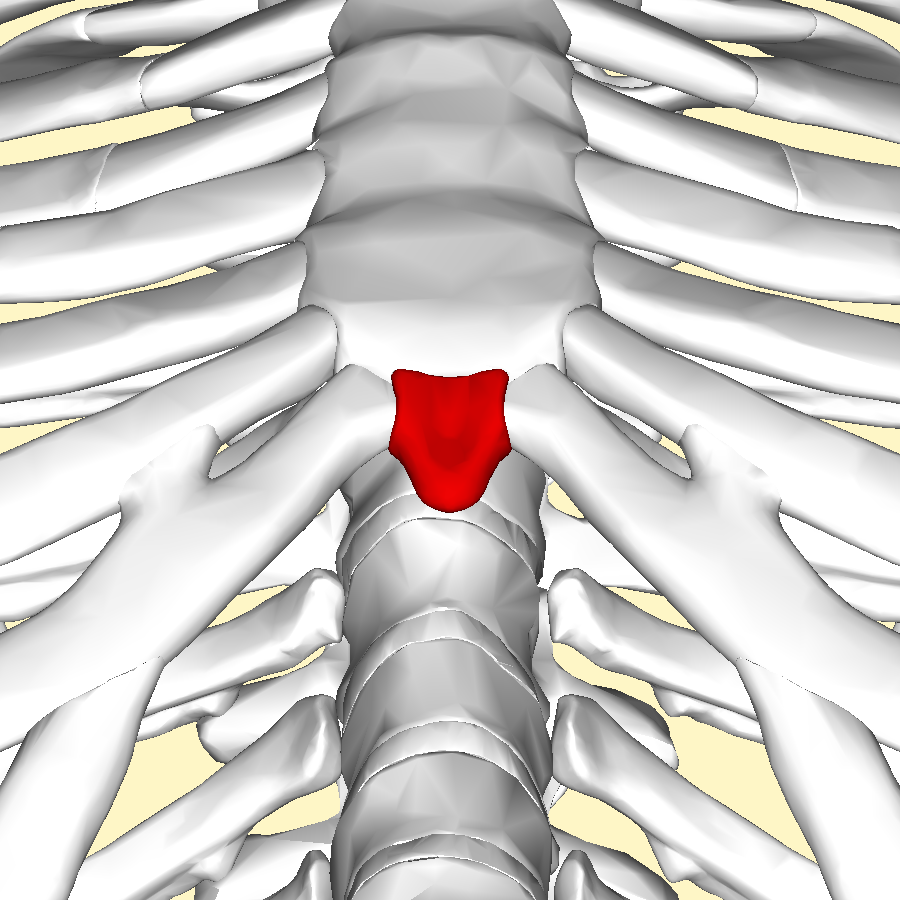
Close up.

Shape of a xiphoid process (animation)
