= Abscess =

Localized collection of pus in body tissue

- Other names: Latin: Abscessus
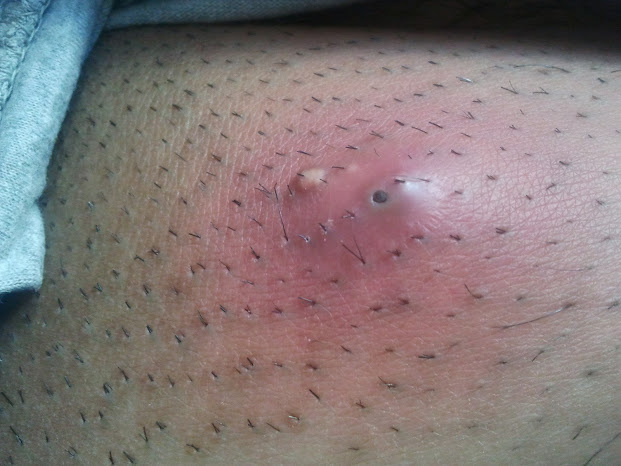
- Five-day-old inflamed epidermal inclusion cyst. The black spot is a keratin plug that connects with the underlying cyst.
- Specialty: General surgery, infectious disease, dermatology, interventional radiology
- Symptoms: Redness, pain, swelling
- Usual onset: Rapid
- Causes: Bacterial infection (often MRSA)
- Risk factors: Intravenous drug use
- Diagnostic method: Ultrasound, CT scan
- Differential diagnosis: Cellulitis, sebaceous cyst, necrotising fasciitis
- Treatment: Incision and drainage, Antibiotics
- Frequency: ~1% per year (United States)

An abscess is a collection of pus that has built up within the tissue of the body, usually caused by bacterial infection. Signs and symptoms of abscesses include redness, pain, warmth, and swelling. The swelling may feel fluid-filled when pressed. The area of redness often extends beyond the swelling. Carbuncles and boils are types of abscess that often involve hair follicles, with carbuncles being larger. A cyst is related to an abscess, but it contains a material other than pus, and a cyst has a clearly defined wall. Abscesses can also form internally on internal organs and after surgery.

They are usually caused by a bacterial infection. Often many different types of bacteria are involved in a single infection. In many areas of the world, the most common bacteria present are methicillin-resistant Staphylococcus aureus. Skin abscesses in particular are overwhelmingly caused by S. aureus. Rarely, parasites can cause abscesses; this is more common in the developing world. Diagnosis of a skin abscess is usually made based on what it looks like and is confirmed by cutting it open. Ultrasound imaging may be useful in cases in which the diagnosis is not clear. In abscesses around the anus, computer tomography (CT) may be important to look for deeper infection.

Standard treatment for most skin or soft tissue abscesses is cutting it open and drainage. There appears to be some benefit from also using antibiotics. A small amount of evidence supports not packing the cavity that remains with gauze after drainage. Closing this cavity right after draining it rather than leaving it open may speed healing without increasing the risk of the abscess returning. Sucking out the pus with a needle is often not sufficient.

Skin abscesses are common and some studies suggest they have become more common over the past two decades Risk factors include intravenous drug use, with rates reported as high as 65% among users. In 2005, 3.2 million people went to American emergency departments for abscesses. In Australia, around 13,000 people were hospitalized in 2008 with the condition.

== Signs and symptoms ==
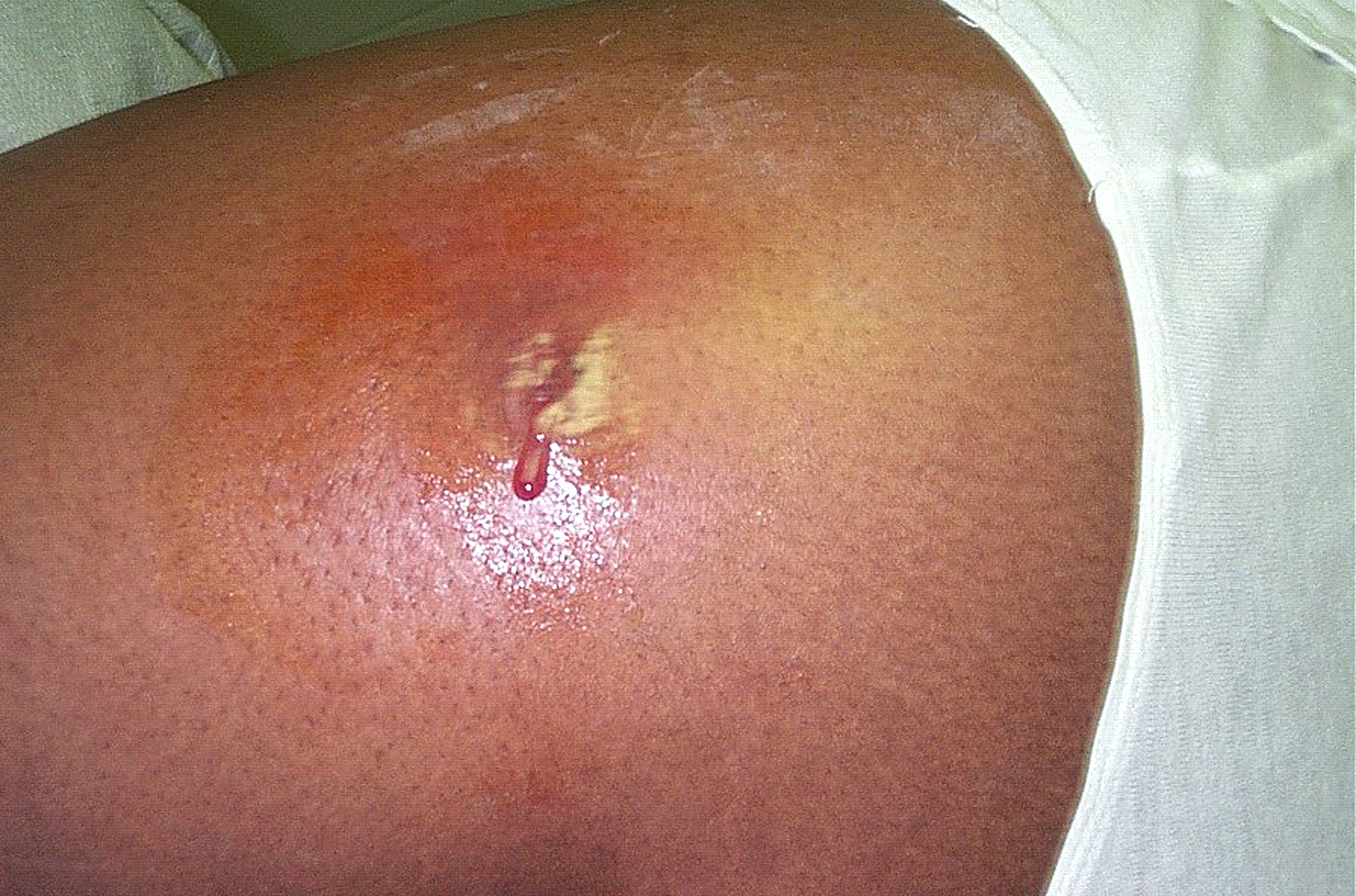
A cutaneous abscess caused by MRSA.

Abscesses may occur in any tissue, but most frequently within the skin surface (where they may be superficial pustules known as boils or deep skin abscesses), in the lungs, brain, teeth, kidneys, and tonsils. Major complications may include spreading of the abscess material to adjacent or remote tissues, and extensive regional tissue death (gangrene).

The main symptoms and signs of a skin abscess are redness, heat, swelling, pain, and loss of function. There may also be high temperature (fever) and chills. If superficial, abscesses may be fluctuant when palpated; this wave-like motion is caused by movement of the pus inside the abscess.

An internal abscess is more difficult to identify and depends on the location of the abscess and the type of infection. General signs include pain in the affected area, a high temperature, and generally feeling unwell. Internal abscesses rarely heal themselves, so prompt medical attention is indicated if such an abscess is suspected. An abscess can potentially be fatal depending on where it is located.

== Causes ==
Risk factors for abscess formation include intravenous drug use. Another possible risk factor is a prior history of disc herniation or other spinal abnormality, though this has not been proven.

Abscesses are caused by bacterial infection, parasites, or foreign substances. Bacterial infection is the most common cause, particularly Staphylococcus aureus. The more invasive methicillin-resistant Staphylococcus aureus (MRSA) may also be a source of infection, though it is much rarer. Among spinal subdural abscesses, methicillin-sensitive S. aureus is the most common organism involved.

Rarely parasites can cause abscesses, and this is more common in the developing world. Specific parasites known to do this include dracunculiasis and myiasis. In immunocompromised people, and particularly those with AIDS, Toxoplasma gondii is a frequent cause of widespread abscesses throughout the body, including in the brain.

=== Skin abscess ===
An abscess may form anywhere that bacteria can get through the skin, including insect bites, lacerations, puncture wounds, scrapes, IV injection sites, and other small surface-level injuries. The overwhelming majority of skin abscesses are caused by Staphylococcus aureus (methicillin-susceptible or methicillin-resistant), with some studies showing over 90% of documented and cultured skin abscesses being caused by this organism.

=== Anorectal abscess ===
Anorectal abscesses can be caused by non-specific obstruction and ensuing infection of the glandular crypts inside the anus or rectum. Other causes include cancer, trauma, or inflammatory bowel diseases.

=== Incisional abscess ===
An incisional abscess develops as a complication secondary to a surgical incision. It presents as redness and warmth at the margins of the incision with purulent drainage. If the diagnosis is uncertain, the wound should be aspirated with a needle, with aspiration of pus confirming the diagnosis and availing for Gram stain and bacterial culture.

=== Internal abscess ===
Abscesses can form inside the body. The cause can be from trauma, surgery, an infection, or a pre-existing condition.

== Pathophysiology ==
An abscess is a buildup of pus surrounded by normal body tissue. In most cases, abscesses are caused by an infectious species of bacteria, and they function to wall off the infection from uninfected tissues.

Organisms or foreign materials destroy the local cells, which results in the release of cytokines. The cytokines trigger an inflammatory response, which draws large numbers of white blood cells to the area and increases the regional blood flow.

The final structure of the abscess is an abscess wall, or capsule, formed by adjacent healthy cells in an attempt to keep the pus from infecting neighboring structures. However, such encapsulation tends to prevent immune cells from attacking bacteria in the pus or from reaching the causative organism or foreign object.

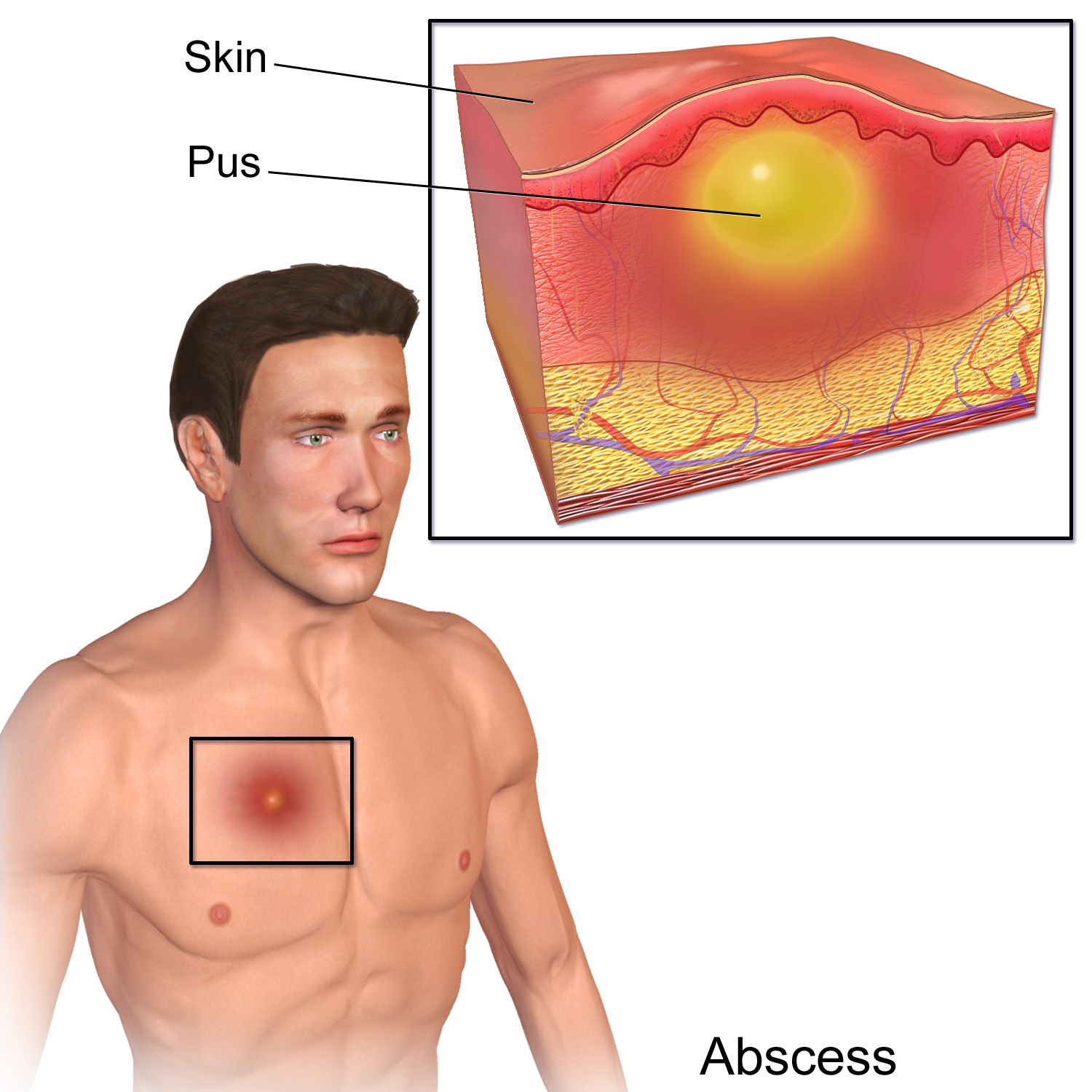
A diagram of an abscess

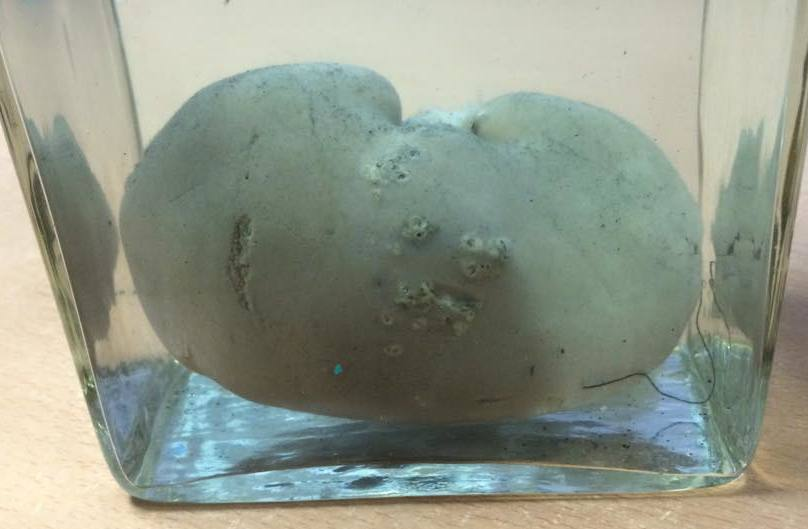
Pyemic abscesses of a kidney

== Diagnosis ==
Ultrasound showing dark (hypoechoic) area involving skin and subcutaneous tissue with moving internal debris in keeping with abscess

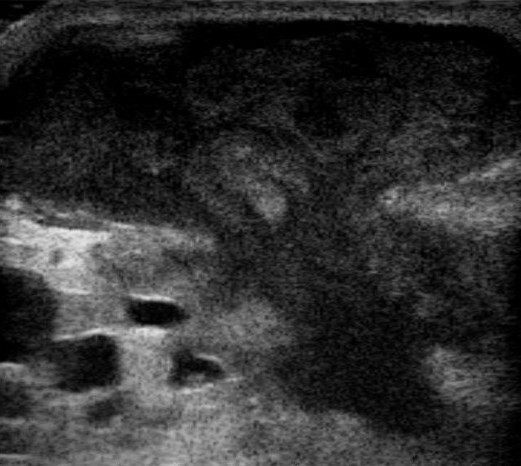
Ultrasound image showing an abscess, appearing as a mushroom-shaped dark (hypoechoic) area within the fibroglandular tissue of the breast

An abscess is a localized collection of pus (purulent inflammatory tissue) caused by suppuration buried in a tissue, an organ, or a confined space, lined by the pyogenic membrane. Ultrasound imaging can help in a diagnosis.

=== Classification ===
Abscesses may be classified as either skin abscesses or internal abscesses. Skin abscesses are common; internal abscesses tend to be harder to diagnose and more serious. Skin abscesses are also called cutaneous or subcutaneous abscesses.

=== IV drug use ===
For those with a history of intravenous drug use, an X-ray is recommended before treatment to verify that no needle fragments are present. If there is also a fever present in this population, infectious endocarditis should be considered.

=== Differential ===
Abscesses should be differentiated from empyemas, which are accumulations of pus in a preexisting, rather than a newly formed, anatomical cavity.

Other conditions that can cause similar symptoms include: cellulitis, a sebaceous cyst, and necrotising fasciitis. Cellulitis typically also has an erythematous reaction, but does not confer any purulent drainage.

== Treatment ==
The standard treatment for an uncomplicated skin or soft-tissue abscess is the incision and drainage procedure. There does not appear to be any benefit from also using antibiotics in most cases. A small amount of evidence did not find a benefit from packing the abscess with gauze.

=== Incision and drainage ===
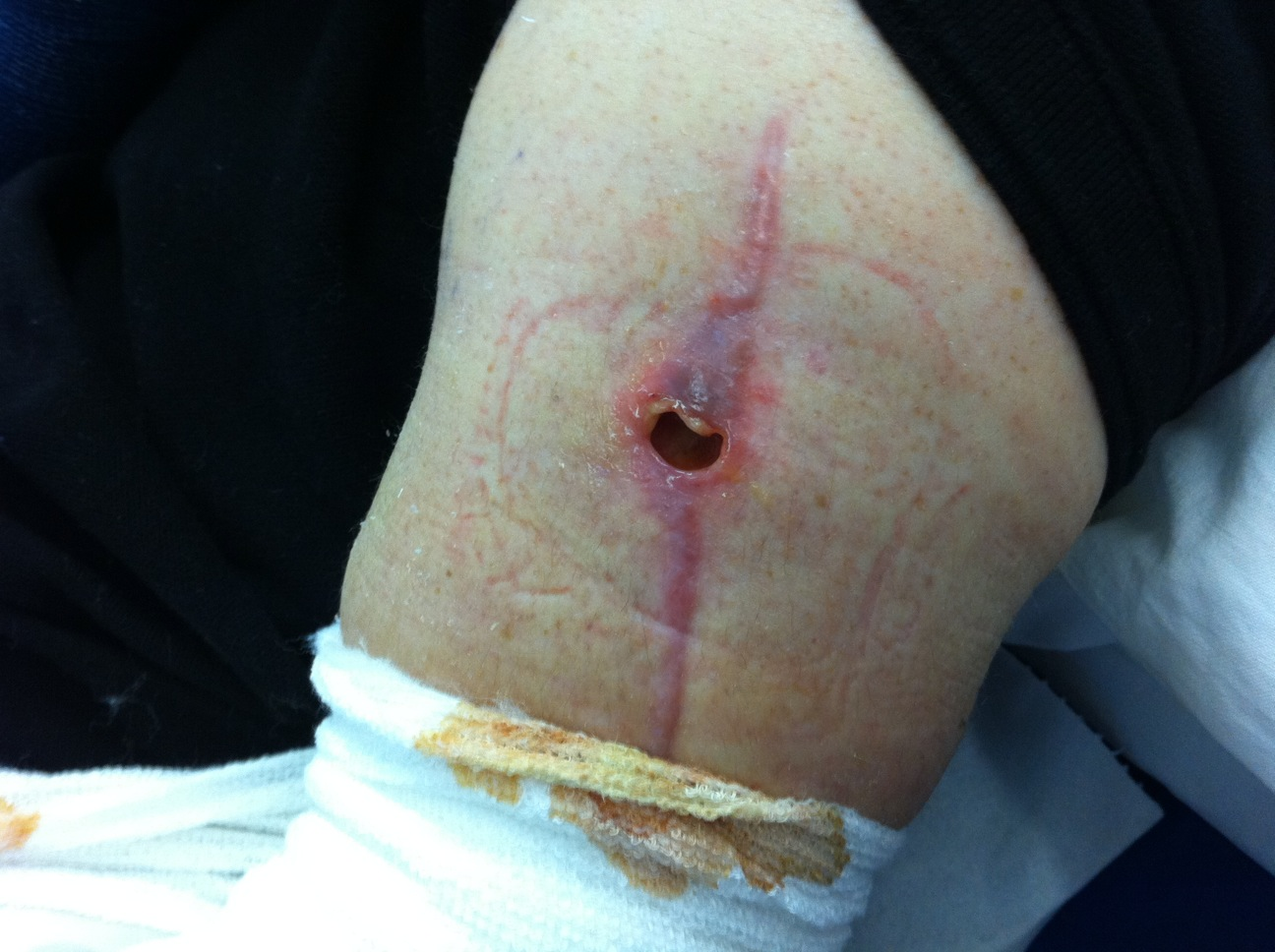
Abscess following curettage

The abscess should be inspected to see if foreign objects are the cause, which may require their removal. If foreign objects are not the cause, incising and draining the abscess is standard treatment. In most cases, a localized injection of lidocaine and epinephrine precedes the incision, to suppress pain.

=== Antibiotics ===
Most people with an uncomplicated skin abscess should not use antibiotics. Antibiotics in addition to standard incision and drainage are recommended in persons with severe abscesses, many sites of infection, rapid disease progression, the presence of cellulitis, symptoms indicating bacterial illness throughout the body, or a health condition causing immunosuppression. People who are very young or very old may also need antibiotics. If the abscess does not heal only with incision and drainage, or if the abscess is in a place that is difficult to drain, such as the face, hands, or genitals, then antibiotics may be indicated.

In those cases of abscess which do require antibiotic treatment, Staphylococcus aureus bacteria are a common cause and an anti-staphylococcus antibiotic such as flucloxacillin or dicloxacillin is used. The Infectious Diseases Society of America advises that the draining of an abscess is not enough to address community-acquired methicillin-resistant Staphylococcus aureus (MRSA). In those cases, traditional antibiotics may be ineffective. Alternative antibiotics effective against community-acquired MRSA often include clindamycin, doxycycline, minocycline, and trimethoprim-sulfamethoxazole. The American College of Emergency Physicians advises that typical cases of abscess from MRSA get no benefit from having antibiotic treatment in addition to the standard treatment.

Culturing the wound is not needed if standard follow-up care can be provided after the incision and drainage. Performing a wound culture is unnecessary because it rarely gives information that can be used to guide treatment.

=== Packing ===
In North America, after drainage, an abscess cavity is usually packed, often with special iodoform-treated cloth. This is done to absorb and neutralize any remaining exudate as well as to promote draining and prevent premature closure. Prolonged draining is thought to promote healing. The hypothesis is that though the heart's pumping action can deliver immune and regenerative cells to the edge of an injury, an abscess is by definition a void in which no blood vessels are present. Packing is thought to provide a wicking action that continuously draws beneficial factors and cells from the body into the void that must be healed. Discharge is then absorbed by cutaneous bandages, and further wicking is promoted by changing these bandages regularly. However, evidence from emergency medicine literature reports that packing wounds after draining, especially smaller wounds, causes pain to the person and does not decrease the rate of recurrence, nor bring faster healing, or fewer physician visits.

=== Loop drainage ===
More recently, several North American hospitals have opted for less-invasive loop drainage over standard drainage and wound packing. In one study of 143 pediatric outcomes, a failure rate of 1.4% was reported in the loop group versus 10.5% in the packing group (P<.030), while a separate study reported a 5.5% failure rate among the loop group.

=== Primary closure ===
Closing an abscess immediately after draining it appears to speed healing without increasing the risk of recurrence. This may not apply to anorectal abscesses, as while they may heal faster, there may be a higher rate of recurrence than those left open.

=== Appendiceal abscess ===
Appendiceal abscesses are complications of appendicitis, where there is an infected mass on the appendix. This condition is estimated to occur in 2–10% of appendicitis cases and is usually treated by surgical removal of the appendix (appendicectomy).

== Prognosis ==
Even without treatment, skin abscesses rarely result in death, as they will naturally break through the skin. Other types of abscesses are more dangerous. Brain abscesses may be fatal if untreated. When treated, the mortality rate decreases to 5–10%, but it is higher if the abscess ruptures.

== Epidemiology ==
Skin abscesses are common and have become more common in recent years. Risk factors include intravenous drug use, with rates reported as high as 65% among users. In 2005, in the United States, 3.2 million people went to the emergency department for an abscess. In Australia, around 13,000 people were hospitalized in 2008 for the disease.

== Society and culture ==
The Latin medical aphorism "ubi pus, ibi evacua" expresses "where there is pus, there evacuate it" and is classical advice in the culture of Western medicine.

Needle exchange programmes often administer or provide referrals for abscess treatment to injection drug users as part of a harm reduction public health strategy.

=== Etymology ===
An abscess is so called "abscess" because there is an abscessus (a going away or departure) of portions of the animal tissue from each other to make room for the suppurated matter lodged between them.

The word carbuncle is believed to have originated from the Latin: carbunculus, originally a small coal; diminutive of carbon-, carbo: charcoal or ember, but also a carbuncle stone, "precious stones of a red or fiery colour", usually garnets.

== Types ==
Different types of abscess include:

- Alveolar abscess
- Bartholin abscess
- Brain abscess
- Brodie abscess
- Caseous lymphadenitis
- Collar stud abscess
- Cold abscess
- Dental abscess
  - Periodontal abscess
  - Pericoronal abscess
  - Combined periodontic-endodontic abscess
- Dubois abscesses
- Hidradenitis suppurativa
- Otitic abscess
- Pancreatic abscess
- Pelvic abscess
- Peritonsillar abscess
- Premammary abscess (including subareolar abscess)
- Retropharyngeal abscess
- Subhepatic abscess
- Tubo-ovarian abscess
