= Alex Smith =

American football player (born 1984)

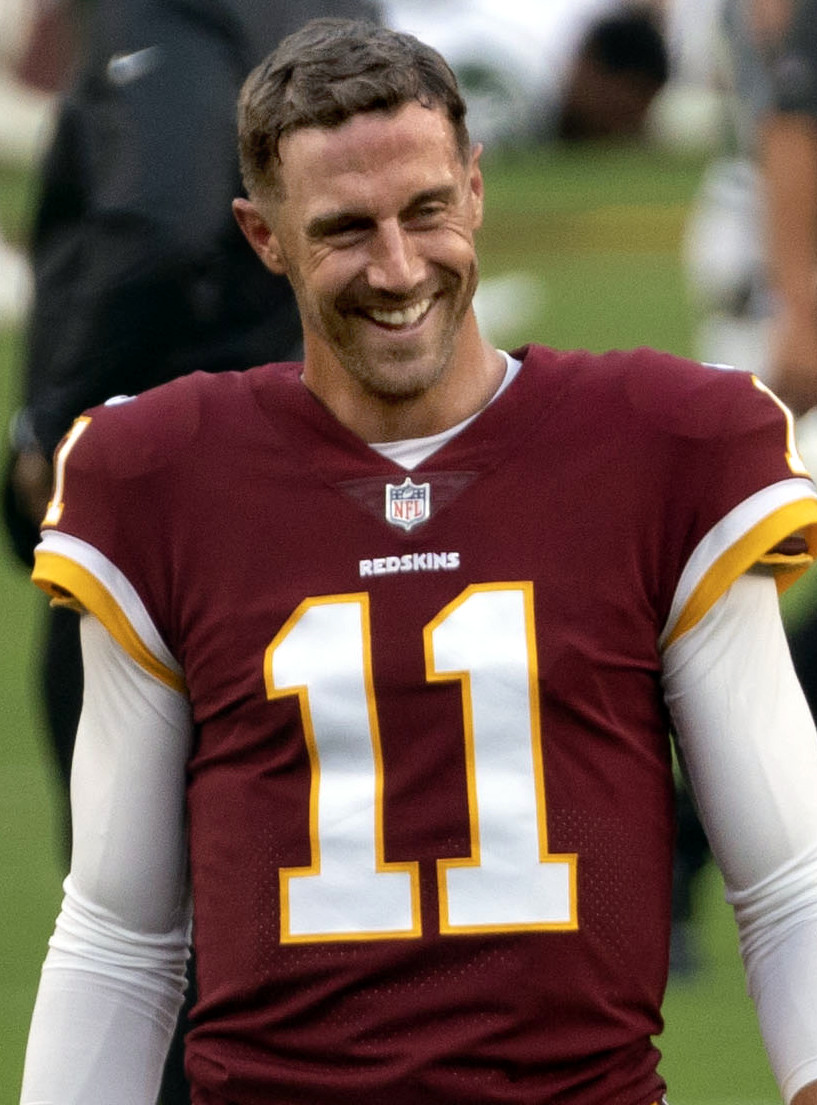
- Smith with the Washington Redskins in 2018

No. 11
- Position: Quarterback

Personal information
- Born: May 7, 1984 (age 42); Bremerton, Washington, U.S.
- Listed height: 6 ft 4 in (1.93 m)
- Listed weight: 215 lb (98 kg)

Career information
- High school: Helix (La Mesa, California)
- College: Utah (2002–2004)
- NFL draft: 2005: 1st round, 1st overall pick

Career history
- San Francisco 49ers (2005–2012); Kansas City Chiefs (2013–2017); Washington Redskins / Football Team (2018–2020)

Awards and highlights
- NFL Comeback Player of the Year (2020); 3× Pro Bowl (2013, 2016, 2017); NFL passer rating leader (2017); George Halas Award (2021); Sporting News Player of the Year (2004); First-team All-American (2004); MW Offensive Player of the Year (2004); First-team All-MW (2004); Second-team All-MW (2003)

Career NFL statistics
- Passing attempts: 5,193
- Passing completions: 3,250
- Completion percentage: 62.6%
- TD–INT: 199–109
- Passing yards: 35,650
- Passer rating: 86.9
- Stats at Pro Football Reference
- College Football Hall of Fame

Alexander Douglas Smith (born May 7, 1984) is an American former professional football quarterback who played in the National Football League (NFL) for 16 seasons. He played college football for the Utah Utes, earning first-team All-American honors and winning MW Offensive Player of the Year in 2004. Smith was selected first overall by the San Francisco 49ers in the 2005 NFL draft.

Smith had a breakout season in 2011 when he led the 49ers to their first division title and playoff win since 2002 and their first NFC Championship Game appearance since 1997. The following season, a concussion resulted in Smith losing his starting position to backup Colin Kaepernick. Smith was traded to the Kansas City Chiefs the following offseason and guided them to four playoff runs between 2013 and 2017, their first consecutive division titles in franchise history, and their first playoff victory since 1993 during the 2015 season. Smith also received three Pro Bowl selections with the Chiefs and led the league in passer rating in 2017. He was traded to the Washington Redskins in 2018 to make way for second-year quarterback Patrick Mahomes, but was credited with helping develop the future NFL MVP.

During his first season in Washington, Smith suffered a life-threatening injury to his right leg that nearly resulted in amputation. Although expected never to play again, Smith completed a lengthy rehabilitation process that allowed him to return in 2020. Smith became the starter midway through the season, leading the team to a division title and earning NFL Comeback Player of the Year honors. He retired during the 2021 offseason after being released. Smith's return from injury is considered one of the greatest comeback stories in NFL history. He was inducted to the College Football Hall of Fame in 2024.

== Early life ==
Alexander Douglas Smith was born on May 7, 1984, in Bremerton, Washington. He grew up in La Mesa, California. His father, Douglas D. Smith, was an executive director at Helix High School, which Smith attended.

As a starter for the Helix Highlanders during his junior and senior years, Smith led the team to a 25–1 record, including two San Diego CIF section championships. He was named to the first-team all-conference and all-county squads in the San Diego CIF system. Smith also earned the conference offensive player of the year twice, and twice won the team MVP for Helix. During his time at Helix, Smith set a school record by throwing for six touchdowns in one game, and recorded the second-highest completion percentage in San Diego CIF history. While at Helix, he was teammates with future NFL star Reggie Bush. Smith and Bush were finalists for the 2004 Heisman Trophy, making it the first time a high school had two finalists at the same ceremony. Bush went on to win the 2005 award.

Smith was president of his senior class in high school, earned college credits through a program at San Diego State University, and took a dozen Advanced Placement tests.

== College career ==
Smith attended the University of Utah and played for the Utah Utes, wearing number 11. He finished fourth in voting for the 2004 Heisman Trophy and was selected as the 2004 Mountain West Conference Player of the Year. Smith posted a 21–1 record as a starter in college, while leading a high-powered spread offense under head coach Urban Meyer. He led the Utes to victories in the 2003 Liberty Bowl and the 2005 Fiesta Bowl. Smith earned a bachelor's degree in economics in two years and began work on a master's degree before being drafted.

== Professional career ==
=== Pre-draft ===
Pre-draft measurables
| Height | Weight | Arm length | Hand span | 40-yard dash | 10-yard split | 20-yard split | 20-yard shuttle | Three-cone drill | Vertical jump | Broad jump | Wonderlic |
|---|---|---|---|---|---|---|---|---|---|---|---|
| 6 ft 4 1/8 in (1.93 m) | 217 lb (98 kg) | 31 3/4 in (0.81 m) | 9 1/8 in (0.23 m) | 4.71 s | 1.67 s | 2.80 s | 3.96 s | 6.82 s | 32 in (0.81 m) | 9 ft 5 in (2.87 m) | 40 |
All values from NFL Combine

At the NFL Combine, Smith recorded a 4.7 time in the 40-yard dash, and had a 32-inch vertical leap. He also scored 40 out of 50 on the Wonderlic test.

=== San Francisco 49ers ===
==== 2005 season ====
The San Francisco 49ers, who held the first overall pick, had hired a head coach with a strong personality in Mike Nolan. Nolan also evaluated California quarterback Aaron Rodgers, but did not believe that Rodgers' attitude could co-exist with him. Smith was the first overall pick in the 2005 NFL draft, selected by the 49ers. In July 2005, Smith signed a six-year, $49.5 million contract with $24 million guaranteed.

Dealing with an injury and being taken in and out of the lineup by head coach Mike Nolan, Smith played in nine games as a rookie, throwing for 875 yards, a touchdown, and 11 interceptions.

==== 2006 season ====
After the challenges faced in his rookie campaign, Smith went into the 2006 season with a new offensive coordinator (Norv Turner) and an improved set of offensive weapons around him. The 49ers used their top draft choice on tight end Vernon Davis. They also upgraded their offensive backfield, trading underachieving running back Kevan Barlow to the Jets, making Frank Gore the feature back.

Smith also spent the off-season working daily with his new coordinator, wide receivers, and tight end while working to improve his technique and add bulk. The improved offensive cast clearly helped Smith develop in his second year, especially early. Smith's first three games of the season saw him throw three touchdowns, no interceptions, and amass 814 yards. After struggling in Kansas City, he then threw for three touchdowns against the Oakland Raiders, setting a career-high. However, the next five games saw Smith resume his growing pains, averaging only 153 yards per game while throwing only six touchdowns and nine interceptions. Despite his difficulty, he led the 49ers on a three-game winning streak in November.

Smith met Joe Montana for the first time on November 5, 2006, during a game against the Vikings. The 49ers wore the throwback jerseys of the 1989 team which Joe Montana and teammates wore. The 49ers went on to win 9–3, upsetting the Minnesota Vikings.

In need of a statement game, the 49ers traveled to Seattle for a Thursday Night Football game against their division rivals. During the broadcast on NFL Network, Cris Collinsworth noted that if he were starting an NFL franchise, he would have taken Broncos rookie quarterback Jay Cutler before Alex Smith and fellow rookies Matt Leinart and Vince Young – and that Smith was not even close to the others. Going into the 4th quarter, the 49ers were trailing the Seahawks 7–3, and pulling out a win looked unlikely. Smith however performed brilliantly in the fourth quarter, and drove the 49ers on a long touchdown drive down the field early, taking a narrow 10–7 lead. Late in the quarter, with the same score, Smith struck again – shaking off an almost certain sack, rolling to the left and completing a pass to Frank Gore for a touchdown to give the 49ers a 10-point lead. On the next drive, Smith cemented the victory by leading yet another touchdown drive, and rushing for a touchdown on a naked bootleg. Collinsworth had earlier in the game observed that "Alex Smith is the best I've ever seen him. That drive is the best I saw," and on seeing his touchdown run, commented "What a second-half he has had!"

After losing to the Cardinals the following week, the 49ers' final game of the 2006 season was against a Denver Broncos team looking for a playoff berth. In a major upset, the 49ers defeated the Broncos and knocked them out of the playoffs. During the game at INVESCO Field, Smith threw for 194 yards and a touchdown, leading the team to a come from behind victory for the second time in three weeks.

Overall, Smith improved in his second year by throwing as many touchdowns as interceptions. He threw for 16 touchdowns, 16 interceptions, 2,890 yards, and a 74.8 quarterback rating, all improvements over his rookie year. He became the first 49ers quarterback in club history to take every snap from center over the course of a season in 2006.

==== 2007 season ====
Smith entered the 2007 season learning under a third offensive coordinator in three seasons. Norv Turner was hired as the head coach by the San Diego Chargers. Jim Hostler replaced Turner. Hostler's system involved a mixture of the offensive system installed by Turner with elements of the West Coast offense installed by Mike McCarthy for the 2005 season. During the off-season, the 49ers added wide receivers Darrell Jackson, Ashley Lelie, and rookie Jason Hill as new offensive targets for Smith.

In the season opener on Monday Night Football against the Arizona Cardinals, Smith led the 49ers to a 20–17 win in a two-minute comeback. While down 17–13 with less than two minutes left, Smith drove down the field, highlighted by a 25-yard scramble. After the scramble, he threw a 22-yard pass to Arnaz Battle that was fumbled on the one-yard line, but recovered by a 49er so the ball was placed back on the one-yard line with 26 seconds left. The following play, Battle ran an end-around for the game-winning touchdown. Smith finished the game 15 for 31 with 126 yards and two rushes for 37 yards.

On September 30 in the first quarter of a game against the Seattle Seahawks, Smith injured his right shoulder after getting sacked by Seahawks defensive tackle Rocky Bernard. Smith suffered a grade-three separation and the initial diagnosis was that surgery would not be required. Smith missed the next three games before returning to the 49ers' starting lineup on Sunday, October 28, 2007.

The 49ers did not win another game until November 25. Among all NFL quarterbacks who qualify for league statistics, only the Jets' Kellen Clemens had a poorer passer rating than Smith (57.2), Smith completed under 50% of his passes, far below the league average of 60%. Smith was at odds with 49ers head coach Mike Nolan over the severity of his injury. Nolan publicly implied that Smith was not fighting through the injury, while Smith felt that the injury still affected his ability to throw accurately, an account that was supported by players from the Seahawks. Nolan decided to rest Smith following a loss in that game to the Seahawks on November 12 and start Trent Dilfer to allow Smith's shoulder to recover. Following the decision, orthopedic surgeon James Andrews said that upon further examination the shoulder did not heal as significantly as Andrews thought it would, and on December 11, 2007, Smith was placed on injured reserve to undergo surgery on the shoulder, ending his season.

==== 2008 season ====
Smith entered training camp competing for the starting quarterback job with Shaun Hill, who won both of the games he started in 2007, before suffering a back injury against the Tampa Bay Buccaneers, and journeyman J. T. O'Sullivan. Smith would be learning under a fourth different offensive coordinator in four seasons; Jim Hostler was fired and replaced by former Detroit Lions offensive coordinator and St. Louis Rams offensive coordinator/head coach Mike Martz. Unlike the previous three seasons, where offensive continuity was somewhat maintained, Martz's system was completely different. Smith lost the starting job in training camp to O'Sullivan, who was elevated to starting quarterback, partly due to his familiarity with Martz's offense when he was a member of the Detroit Lions.

On September 10, the 49ers placed Smith on injured reserve after Dr. James Andrews confirmed the team's diagnosis of a broken bone in his shoulder, believed to have been caused by a wire left in his shoulder from the previous surgery, which had sawed through the bone. Regardless, the 49ers' general manager, Scot McCloughan, said that the 49ers expected to release Smith before the 2009 season, when they would owe him a salary of $9,625,000.

After Nolan was fired on October 20, 2008, the 49ers expressed interest in having Smith remain for the 2009 season if he was willing to renegotiate his contract. On March 10, 2009, the 49ers announced that his contract had been successfully restructured and that he would stay with the team. He took a considerable pay cut to remain with the 49ers, with whom he would be under contract for the next two years. Smith was to make $4 million a season in 2009 and 2010, in addition to base salaries that were not immediately made known. In his previous contract, he was scheduled to make $24.6 million in the final two years.

==== 2009 season ====
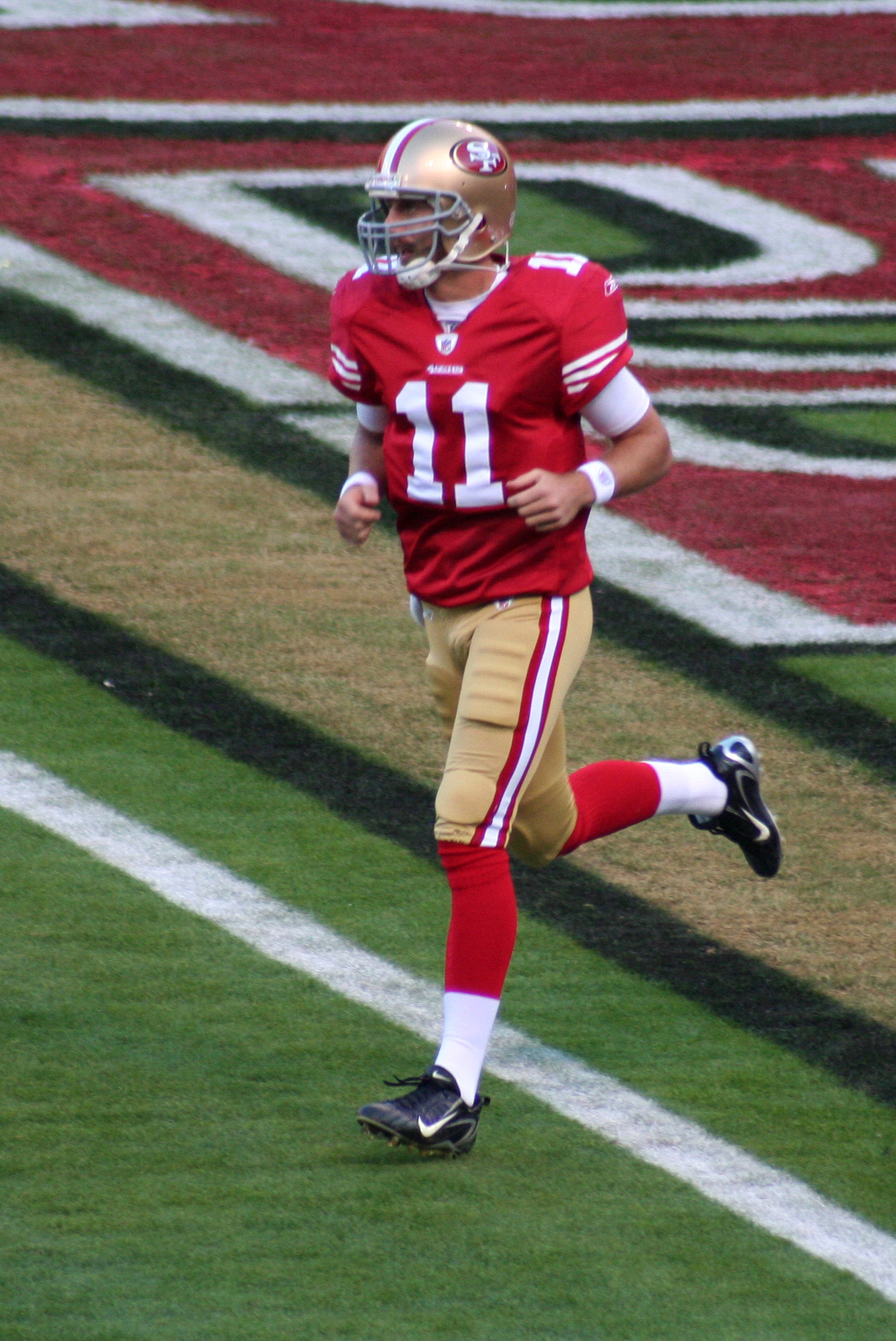
Smith in November 2009

After the pay cut, Smith said that he was ready to compete for the starting quarterback spot, primarily against Shaun Hill.

Mike Singletary became the head coach after a successful term as the interim head coach in 2008, and Martz was fired as offensive coordinator due to the huge differences in offensive philosophies between himself and Singletary. Jimmy Raye II was hired to replace him, marking Smith's fifth different offensive coordinator in five seasons. During the off-season, the 49ers drafted Michael Crabtree to be the featured receiver that Smith had been lacking throughout his NFL career. After restructuring his contract with San Francisco, Smith lost the battle for the starting quarterback position to Shaun Hill. However, in a Week 7 game against the Houston Texans, Smith replaced Hill in the third quarter, after Hill had performed poorly and the Niners faced a 21–0 first-half deficit. Smith led the team back with three touchdown passes, all to tight end Vernon Davis, but fell short of victory, 24–21. Singletary named Smith as the 49ers' starting quarterback the next day at his weekly press conference on October 26.

After his return as the 49ers' starting quarterback, Smith displayed signs of progress, despite the team's 3–4 record in his first seven starts. He led the 49ers to a Week 12 victory, 20–3, against the visiting Jacksonville Jaguars, throwing for 232 yards with two touchdown passes while posting a 96.8 passer rating. In a Week 13 match-up against the NFC West division rival Seattle Seahawks, he recorded the first 300-yard passing game of his career, completing 27 of 45 throws with two touchdown passes. Overall, he finished the season with 2,350 passing yards, 18 touchdowns, and 12 interceptions as the 49ers finished with an 8–8 record.

==== 2010 season ====
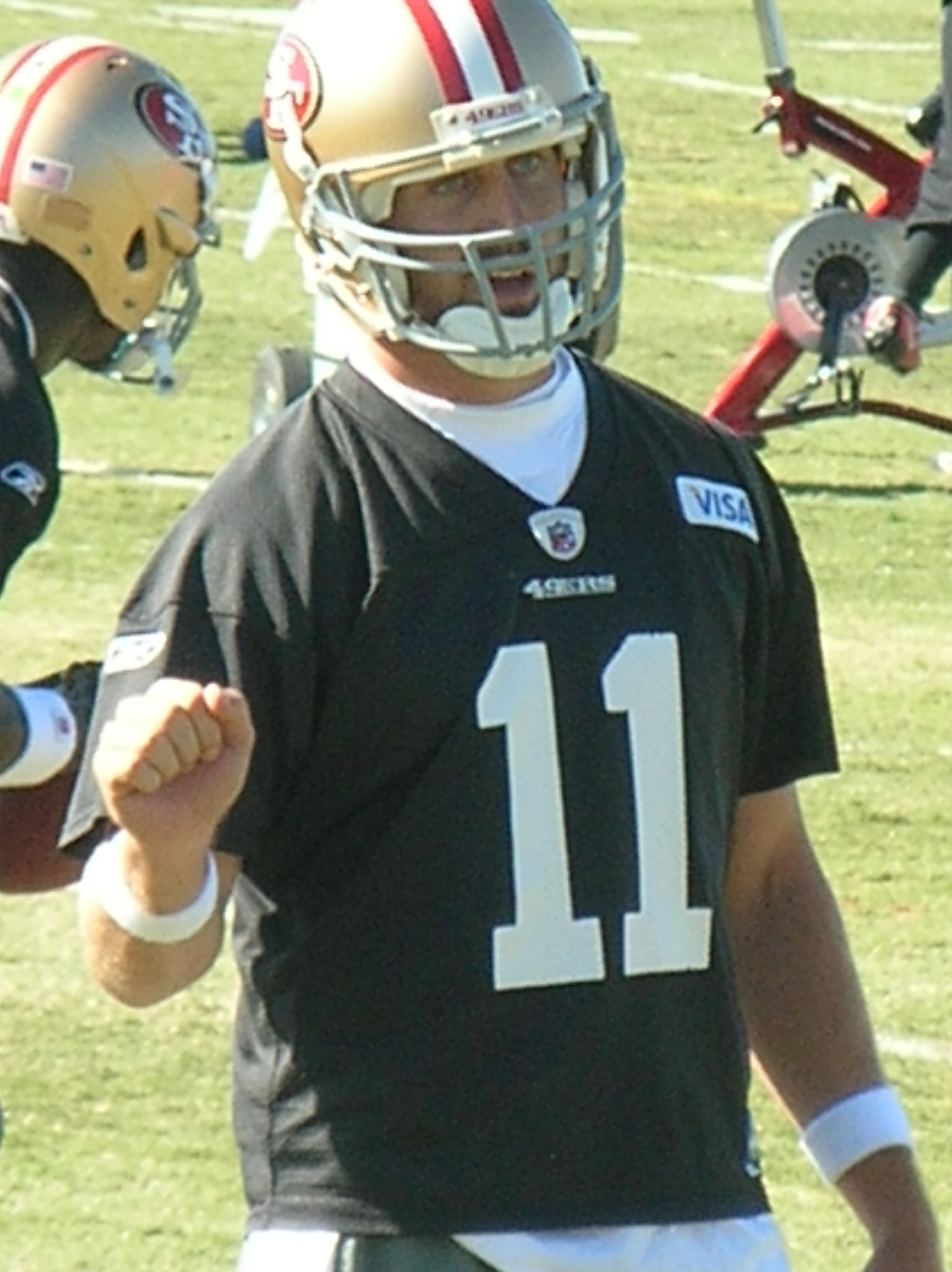
Smith at training camp in 2010

Smith entered the 2010 season as the starting quarterback. For the first time in his career, he returned under the same offensive coordinator from the previous season, as Raye was retained. However, continuity in a poor system resulted in the team starting 0–5, and on September 27, Raye was fired and replaced by quarterbacks coach Mike Johnson. Under Johnson, Smith was expected to run a variation of the spread offense that he ran in college. The 49ers continued to build their team having now drafted Anthony Davis and Mike Iupati with their two first-round picks to provide more protection. On September 8, Coach Singletary announced that Smith was named one of the team's captains.

In Week 5, Smith was booed at home and the crowd chanted for his backup, David Carr, before leading the 49ers to two scoring drives to close within three points. However, he was hit as he threw on the third drive attempt, resulting in an interception and a 24–27 loss, dropping the 49ers to 0–5. Smith once again suffered an injured shoulder in the 49ers week 7 game against the Carolina Panthers and was not available to play Week 8 against the Denver Broncos in London. He was replaced by Troy Smith, who had 14 games of experience in the NFL before joining the 49ers organization just before the start of the regular season. Troy Smith took Smith's position after winning two straight games against the St. Louis Rams and the Denver Broncos.

However, following a loss to the Green Bay Packers in Week 13 that left the 49ers with a 4–8 record, Troy Smith was demoted to backup in favor of Alex Smith. Smith would start against the Seattle Seahawks in Week 14 in a game the 49ers needed to win to stay in contention in the NFC West.

Smith acknowledged that his performances needed to be more consistent. On December 12, 2010, the 49ers played the Seahawks in San Francisco. Smith was booed by the Candlestick crowd after the first two plays. However, the boos turned to cheers after Smith helped lead the 49ers to a 40–21 victory over a division rival. The win moved the 49ers one game behind the division leaders (Rams and Seahawks) with three games left to play. However, the 49ers struggled the following Thursday night against the San Diego Chargers and Troy Smith started the following game against the Rams. Troy Smith struggled in the loss to the Rams and Alex relieved Troy Smith in that game. After the game, Singletary was fired and Alex finished the season starting against the Cardinals. The 49ers finished the season 6–10 and Smith became a free agent after the season. After his firing, Singletary said, "You gotta have a quarterback." Smith had won just 19 games in 50 career starts through 2010.

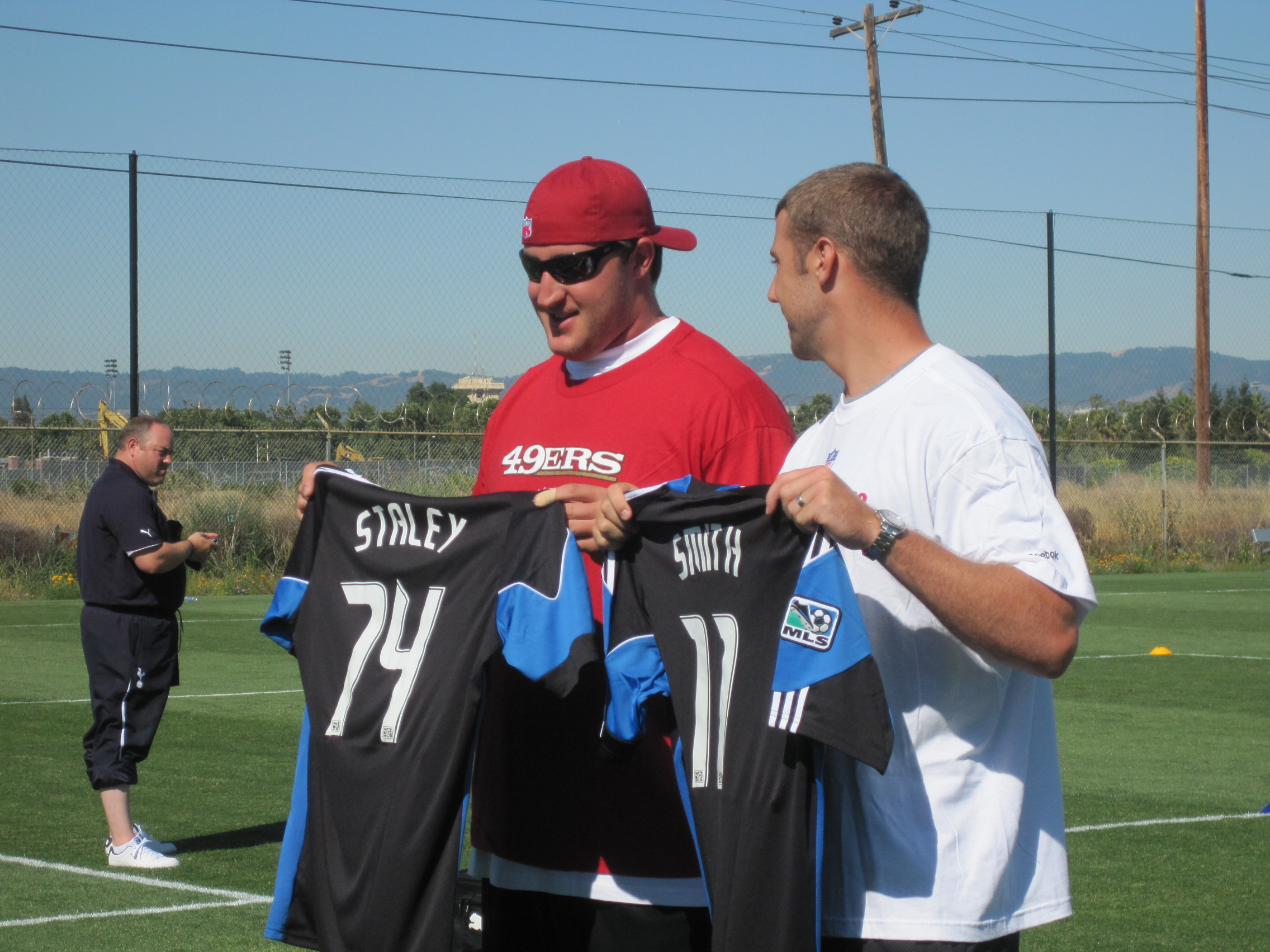
Smith and teammate Joe Staley holding MLS jerseys

In 2010, Smith was chosen as the 11th-smartest athlete in sports by Sporting News.

==== 2011 season ====
The 49ers hired Jim Harbaugh as the new head coach, and Greg Roman replaced Johnson as the new offensive coordinator. Harbaugh made it known to Smith that he was welcomed back on the team. Smith's family wanted him to leave San Francisco. Although he was unsigned, Smith organized the players' workouts during the 2011 NFL lockout and helped to install Harbaugh's new offense. After the lockout ended, Smith signed a one-year $5 million contract with the 49ers. Smith was named the starting quarterback heading into the regular season, and Harbaugh believed Smith could succeed in the coach's West Coast offense.

During the season, Smith's game showed marked improvement, especially in his leadership and intangibles. While he did not put up big numbers, he helped the 49ers win games through efficient play, minimizing mistakes and controlling the clock. In a road game against the Philadelphia Eagles in Week 4, Smith rallied the team from a 23–3 second-half deficit to win 24–23, completing 9 of 9 passes for 179 yards and two touchdowns in the third quarter alone. Two weeks later, Smith led his third come-from-behind road victory of the year with a six-yard fourth and goal touchdown pass to tight end Delanie Walker, beating the Lions in Detroit 25–19. In a week 10 matchup against the New York Giants, he completed 19 out of 30 passes for 242 yards. The Giants shut down the 49ers' run game (Frank Gore was held to zero yards on six carries before leaving the game in the second half) and Smith was instrumental in the 27–20 victory.

By the time the 2011 season was finished, Smith had helped lead the 49ers to a 13–3 record in the regular season, including five come-from-behind victories in which four were on the road, and the 49ers earned a first-round bye in the playoffs. After 3 head coaches, 7 offensive coordinators, and 17 different starting wide receivers in the span of 7 seasons with the 49ers, Smith would finally make his first playoff appearance.

While the 49ers finished with their most wins since 1997, they did it while ranked 29th of 32 teams in the NFL in total passing yardage for 2011 (including yardage lost from sacks), and Smith was often cynically referred to as a "game manager." In this manner, The New York Times wrote that Smith was "a steady, if unspectacular, player surrounded by a solid team" in 2011, whose career year "underscored how much he struggled previously." It was his first season with over 3,000 yards passing, and he set personal single-season highs in virtually every relevant statistical category commonly cited for quarterbacks: in pass attempts with 445, in completions with 273, in completion percentage with 61.3 percent, in passing yards with 3,144, in average per pass with 7.1 yards per attempt, in overall passer rating with 90.7, in rushing attempts with 52, in rushing yards with 179, and in total touchdowns scored with 19 (17 passing & 2 rushing), all while being sacked a league-high 44 times. He also threw a league-low five interceptions in 2011, breaking a 49ers franchise record, and setting yet another personal single-season best in fewest passes intercepted per attempt with a 1.123 percent interception rate, likewise the lowest percentage in the league that year.

In the Divisional Round, Smith led the 49ers to a 36–32 victory over the New Orleans Saints. He threw for 299 yards, three touchdowns, and no interceptions while rushing for an additional touchdown. Smith led touchdown drives of 80 and 85 yards in the final 4:02. He scored on a 28-yard touchdown run, and he threw a game-winning 14-yard touchdown pass to Vernon Davis with nine seconds remaining, eschewing a more conservative open receiver that would have settled for a field goal and a tie. Analyst Ron Jaworski said "Alex Smith won the game, not Alex Smith by not making mistakes. His performance won the game for them." Smith also became the first quarterback in NFL playoff history to lead two go-ahead touchdowns in the final 3 minutes of a game. The 49ers lost 20–17 in overtime to the New York Giants in the NFC Championship Game. Smith completed 12 of 26 passes for 196 yards and two touchdowns, but the team turned the ball over twice on special teams. Smith was chosen by teammates as winner of the Ed Block Courage Award, annually awarded to the player that exemplifies a commitment to sportsmanship and courage. Smith made the USA Today All-Joe Team, an award which is given to the best players not to make the Pro Bowl.

==== 2012 season ====
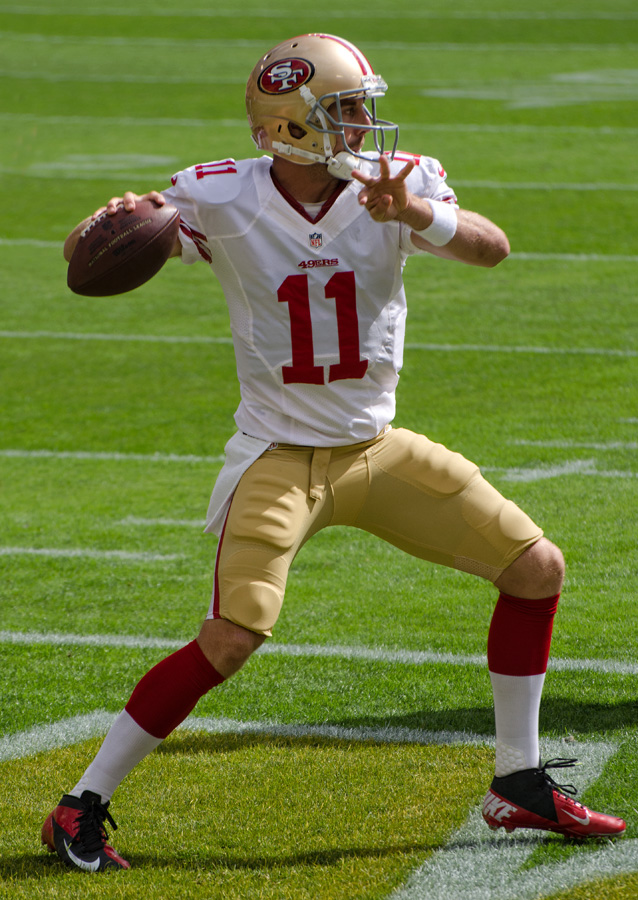
Smith warming up for the 2012 season opener

Smith became a free agent following the 2011 season. The 49ers were reported to be interested in signing Peyton Manning, who had just been released by the rebuilding Indianapolis Colts, leading Smith to visit the Miami Dolphins, reportedly with the intent to sign with the Dolphins if the 49ers signed Manning. Shortly after Manning decided to join the Denver Broncos, Smith signed a three-year contract worth $24 million to remain with the 49ers. During the offseason, the 49ers added wide receivers Randy Moss and Mario Manningham in free agency, and A. J. Jenkins in the first round of the 2012 NFL draft to improve a passing game that lacked production from the receivers the previous season. Smith began the 2012 season as the starting quarterback. Smith completed 18-of-19 passes for 232 yards and three touchdowns without an interception in a 24–3 Monday night victory over Arizona, and San Francisco was 6–2 after eight games. In the next game against the St. Louis Rams, Smith suffered a concussion in the second quarter, throwing a touchdown with blurred vision before exiting the game. He was replaced by Colin Kaepernick, and the game ended in a 24–24 tie.

Smith missed the following game, and Kaepernick was 16 of 23 for 243 yards with two touchdowns in a 32–7 victory over the Chicago Bears. Harbaugh was impressed with Kaepernick, and said "we have two quarterbacks that have a hot hand" while dismissing any rule that a player should not lose their starting job due to an injury. As a result, quarterback controversy began. Smith was ranked third in the NFL in passer rating (104.1), led the league in completion percentage (70%), and had been 19–5–1 as a starter under Harbaugh, while Kaepernick was considered more dynamic with his scrambling ability and arm strength. Smith was medically cleared to play the day before the following game, but Harbaugh chose not to rush him back and again started Kaepernick, who threw and ran for a touchdown in a 31–21 victory over the New Orleans Saints. The following week, Harbaugh announced that Kaepernick would start for the 8–2–1 49ers, while also stating that the assignment was week-to-week and not necessarily permanent. However, Kaepernick remained the starter as the 49ers again qualified for the playoffs. Harbaugh stated that Smith had been more of a coach to Kaepernick later into the 2012 season than even he was. Before losing the starting quarterback job, Smith was on pace to set career highs in completion percentage, passing yards, yards-per-attempt, passing touchdowns and rushing yards. Smith was named to the USA Today All Joe Team for the second year in a row, and was also named the captain of the team.

=== Kansas City Chiefs ===
==== 2013 season ====
On February 27, 2013, the 49ers agreed to trade Smith to the Kansas City Chiefs for the Chiefs' second round pick in the 2013 NFL draft and a conditional pick in the 2014 NFL draft. The deal became official at the beginning of the new league year on March 12.

After the trade became official, Chiefs head coach Andy Reid stated that Smith would be the starting quarterback for the 2013 season. Smith's job as the starter was solidified during OTA's (Organized Team Activities, a term usually referring to NFL pre-season activities). According to coaches and teammates, Smith displayed a very high "football IQ," and his accuracy in passing was lauded as the best many had ever seen. According to Kansas City's quarterbacks coach, Smith was "super intelligent" and had all of the intangibles that he looked for in a quarterback. The Chiefs were the last unbeaten team in the 2013 NFL season with Smith winning his first nine regular-season starts, gaining 1,919 passing yards with nine touchdowns compared to four interceptions. Smith earned his first and only perfect passer rating on December 15, 2013. He was 17 of 20 with 287 yards and 5 touchdowns, four of them going to Jamaal Charles, in a victory over the Oakland Raiders. Smith and the Chiefs lost to Andrew Luck and the Indianapolis Colts in the AFC Wild Card Round – on January 4, 2014. Smith threw four touchdowns, completing 30 of his 46 pass attempts for 378 yards and no interceptions, while also carrying the ball 8 times for 57 yards. However, he did commit his team's only turnover, losing a fumble. The final score of the game was 45–44 in favor of the Colts.

Smith was elected to his first Pro Bowl at the end of the season as a replacement for Tom Brady. In the game, Smith led all quarterbacks in yards, tied for most touchdowns, and led the game-winning touchdown drive at the end of the game that resulted in him throwing a touchdown pass to DeMarco Murray for a 22–21 win.

==== 2014 season ====
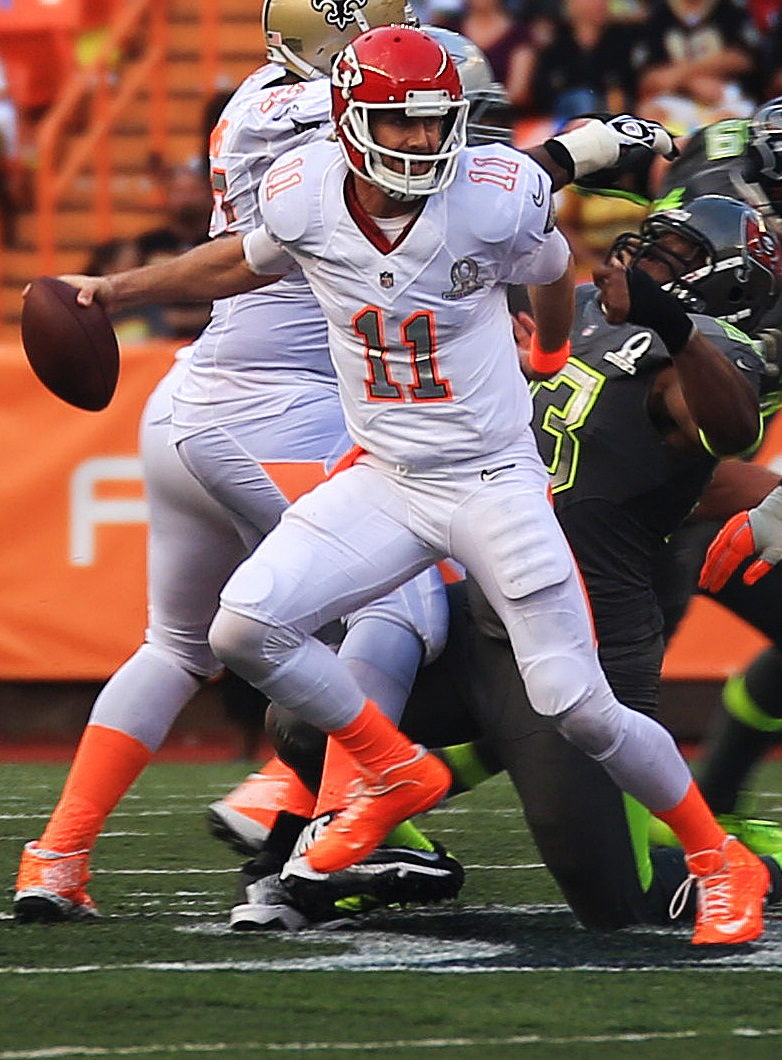
Smith during the 2014 Pro Bowl

On August 31, 2014, Smith and the Chiefs agreed to a four-year contract extension. Smith appeared in 15 games and completed 65.3% of his passes in the 2014 season while throwing for 3,265 yards and 18 touchdowns to only six interceptions. However, the Chiefs finished with a 9–7 record and did not qualify for the playoffs.

==== 2015 season ====
After another strong season in 2015, Smith was elected to the Pro Bowl as an alternate, but turned down the offer. He once again led the Chiefs to the playoffs, where they defeated the Houston Texans 30–0 in the Wild Card Round. Smith threw for 190 yards, a touchdown, and an interception in the victory over the Texans. He also rushed five times for 27 yards and had a 64-yard scramble that was called back due to a holding penalty. The Chiefs went on to lose 27–20 against the New England Patriots in the Divisional Round. The Chiefs became the first team ever to start the season 1–5 and win a playoff game. At the end of the season, Sports Illustrated named Smith the best-looking quarterback in the NFL, an honor previously won by Tom Brady. He was named team MVP for 2015 alongside safety Eric Berry. In the regular season, Smith threw for 3,486 yards, 20 touchdowns, and only seven interceptions, with a completion percentage of 65.3, a passer rating of 95.4, and 7.4 yards per attempt. He also rushed 84 times for 498 yards, two touchdowns, and an average of 5.9 yards per carry. At the end of the season, Smith was recognized as the 81st best player by his peers on the NFL Top 100 Players of 2016.

==== 2016 season ====
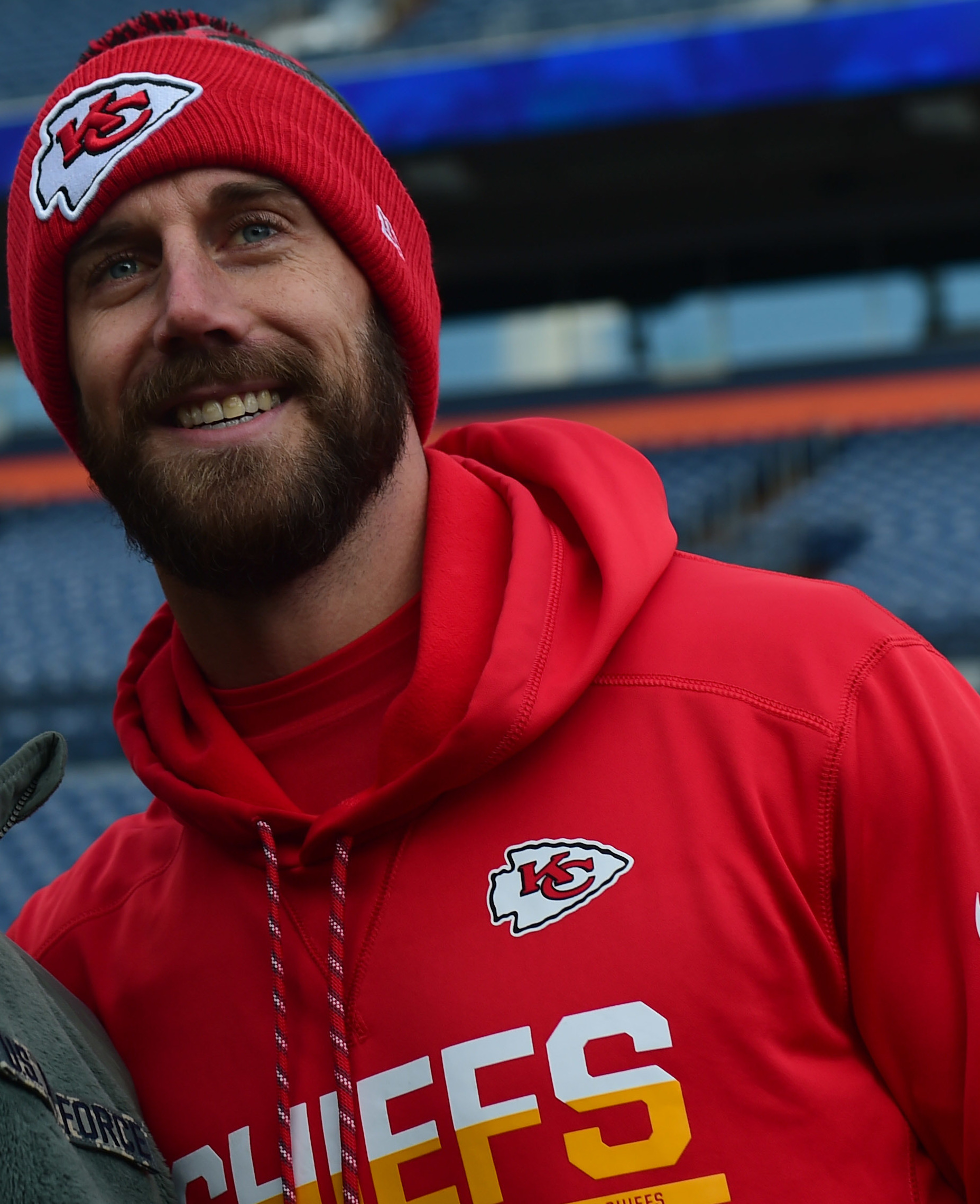
Smith in 2016

During the season opener, Smith led a fourth quarter comeback over the San Diego Chargers to win the game 33–27 in overtime after facing a 24–3 third quarter deficit. Smith won the game in overtime with a two-yard rushing touchdown. This became the largest comeback victory in franchise history as the Chiefs started the season on a positive note. In 2016, Smith posted a career-high passing yards with 3,502 and a career-high 328 completions despite missing one game. He also ran for a career-high five touchdowns, with three of them coming in the last three games. Smith helped lead the Chiefs to the postseason, where they lost to the Pittsburgh Steelers in the Divisional Round. He was ranked 81st by his fellow players, for the second consecutive year, on the NFL Top 100 Players of 2017.

==== 2017 season ====
During the season opener, Smith finished with 368 passing yards and four touchdowns as the Chiefs pulled off a 42–27 road victory over the defending Super Bowl champion New England Patriots. Smith's 368 passing yards and four passing touchdowns were both the second most in a game in his career. Smith's performance in Week 1 led all eligible passers in yards and earned him AFC Offensive Player of the Week, marking the first time that he won the award. During Week 13 against the New York Jets, Smith finished with 366 passing yards and four touchdowns. After the first 2 minutes and 46 seconds had passed in the first quarter, Smith quickly threw two touchdown passes to Travis Kelce. However, the performance was overshadowed as defensive penalties and errors proved to be costly as the Chiefs lost on the road by a score of 38–31. With his performance against the Jets, Smith became the first player in the modern era to have both a 70-yard pass and a 70-yard run in the same game.

With a playoff spot already secured, Smith was given a rest in Week 17, and Chiefs' 2017 first round pick Patrick Mahomes made his NFL debut against the Denver Broncos. Smith finished the 2017 regular season with 4,042 passing yards and 26 touchdowns, both career highs. He was named an alternate for the Pro Bowl, eventually replacing the injured Philip Rivers. Overall, Smith finished with 4,042 passing yards (eighth in the NFL), 26 touchdowns, five interceptions, and a league-leading 104.7 passer rating. During the Wild Card Round against the Tennessee Titans, Smith had 264 passing yards and two touchdowns in the narrow 22–21 loss. He was also credited as being instrumental in the development of Mahomes, who would go on to be named NFL MVP in his first year as a starter and win multiple Super Bowls with the Chiefs. Smith played a part in starting one of the longest eventual division-winning streaks in NFL history as he rounded off his Chiefs career with two consecutive AFC West titles.

=== Washington Redskins / Football Team ===
==== 2018 season ====
On January 30, 2018, Smith was traded to the Washington Redskins in exchange for cornerback Kendall Fuller and a third-round pick (78th overall) in the 2018 NFL draft. The trade became official on March 14, the first day of the new league year. Smith subsequently signed a four-year, $94 million contract extension with the Redskins.

During his Redskins debut, Smith threw for 255 yards and two touchdowns in a 24–6 road victory over the Arizona Cardinals. Through the first nine games of the season, he helped lead Washington to a 6–3 record.

==== Leg injury ====
"I remember a really funny feeling in my leg. It wasn't like I knew it was broken immediately. It went fuzzy. That's what it felt like. And then it really was the visual when I looked down and could see, you know, that my leg obviously wasn't straight anymore that told me that I had broken it."

— Alex Smith, 2021 interview with GQ

During a game against the Houston Texans on November 18, 2018, Smith suffered a spiral and compound fracture to his tibia and fibula in his right leg when he was sacked by Kareem Jackson and J. J. Watt. The injury drew parallels to former Washington quarterback Joe Theismann, who suffered a career-ending leg fracture in a game 33 years to the day prior in 1985. Theismann was also present during the game and witnessed the injury. The game ended with the same score of 23–21 as the one in which Theismann was injured, though the Redskins won the game against the Giants in 1985.

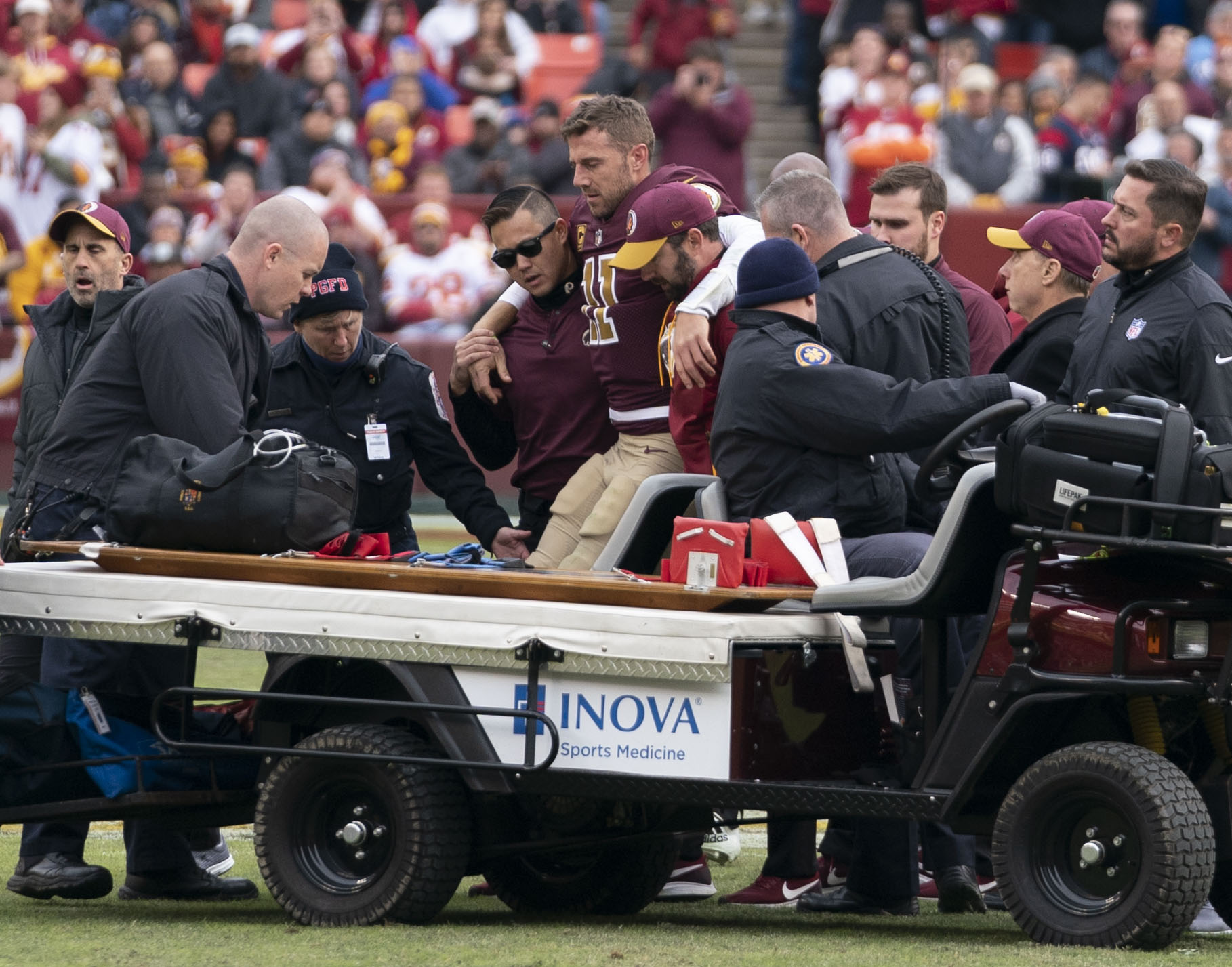
Smith following his leg fracture

Following the initial surgery, Smith developed life-threatening necrotizing fasciitis that resulted in sepsis which required him to undergo 17 surgeries, including eight debridements, across four separate hospital stays over a period of nine months. Doctors had suggested that an amputation above the knee might have been Smith's only option before performing skin grafts and an operation transferring muscle from his left quadriceps to save it.

As a part of his recovery process, Smith wore an external fixation device for nearly a year.

==== 2019 season ====
Smith was placed on the team's physically unable to perform (PUP) reserve list in 2019, missing the entire season. Despite the severity of the injury which many thought he would never come back from, Smith affirmed his intent to return in early 2020. An ESPN documentary following Smith's recovery, Project 11, aired in May 2020.

==== 2020 season: Return and Comeback Player of the Year ====
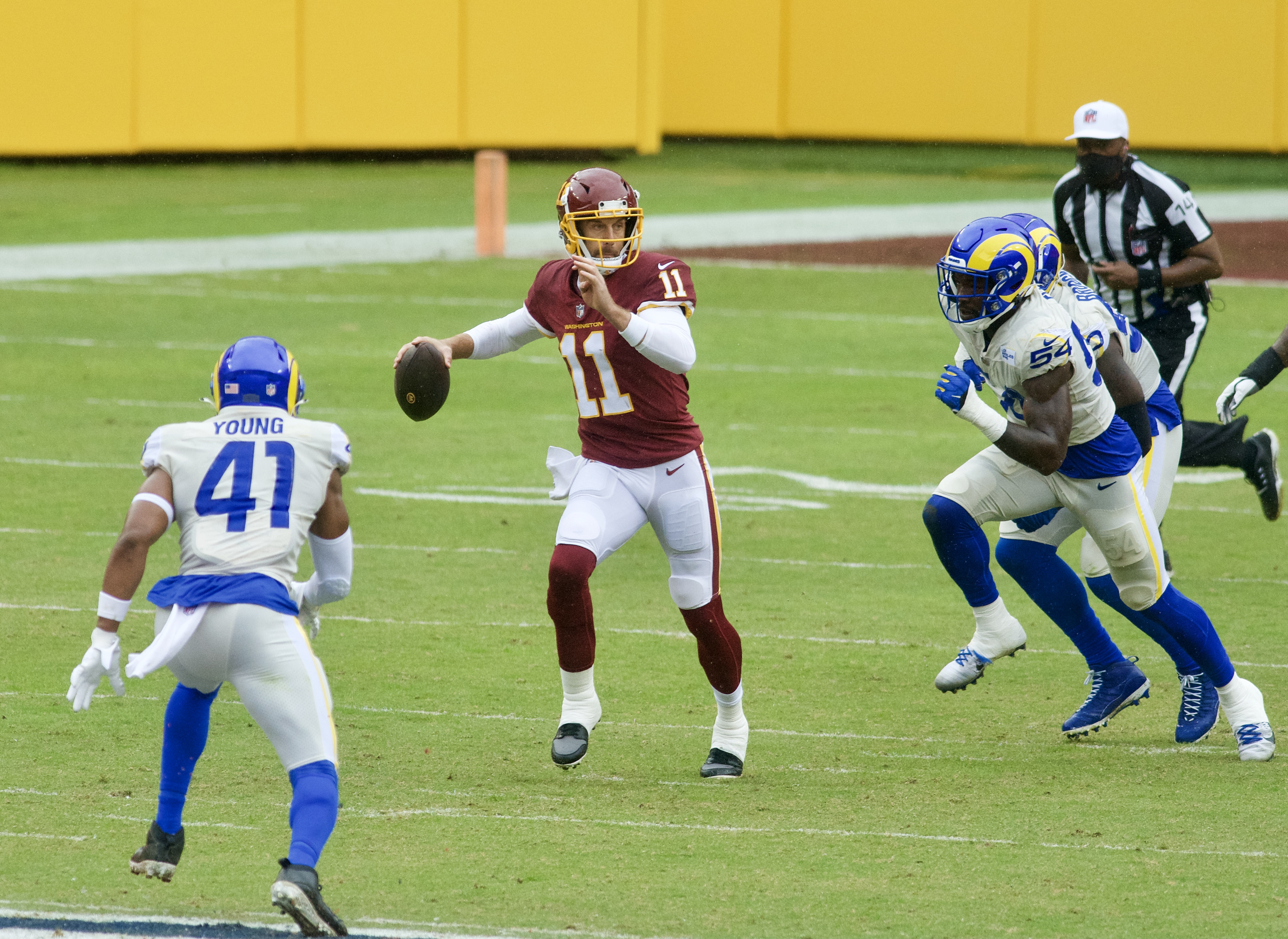
Smith in a 2020 game against the Los Angeles Rams, his first appearance since his leg injury

Smith was cleared by doctors to resume football activities in July 2020 with the team placing him on the physically unable to perform list to begin training camp before being activated on August 16.

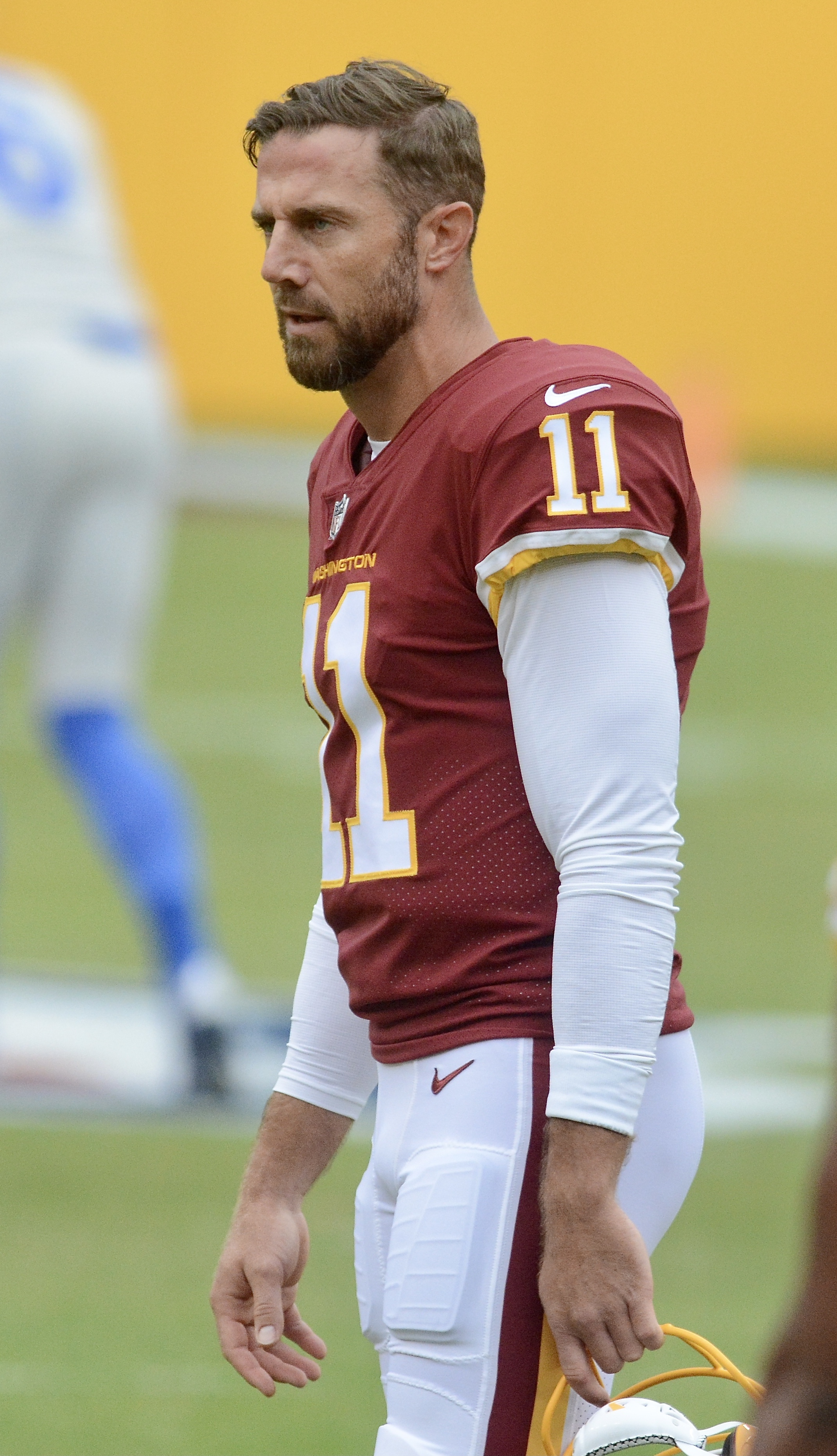
Smith in 2020

Smith's first game appearance since his injury occurred in 2020 against the Los Angeles Rams during Week 5. He entered the game after Kyle Allen left with an arm injury in the second quarter and finished with nine completions for 37 yards while being sacked six times as Washington lost 30–10. Smith made his next appearance in Week 9 against the New York Giants after Allen left the game with a dislocated ankle, throwing for 325 yards, a touchdown, and three interceptions during the 23–20 loss. In the next game against the Detroit Lions, Smith completed 38-of-55 passes for 390 yards, all career highs, during the 30–27 road loss. The following week, he had his first win since the injury in a 20–9 victory over the Cincinnati Bengals. During Week 13 against the 11–0 Pittsburgh Steelers, Smith helped lead Washington to a 23–17 upset road victory with 296 passing yards and a touchdown. The following week, he was pulled out of a game against the San Francisco 49ers due to a bone bruise in his right leg, reported at the time as calf soreness, and subsequently missed the rest of that game and the next two.

Smith returned for the regular-season finale against the Philadelphia Eagles, throwing for 162 yards, two touchdowns, and two interceptions in the 20–14 victory as Washington clinched the NFC East. However, he did not play in the Wild Card Round against the eventual Super Bowl LV champion Tampa Bay Buccaneers due to lingering issues with his bone bruise. In Smith's place, Taylor Heinicke passed for 306 yards, a touchdown, and an interception during the 31–23 loss. Following the season, Smith was named the NFL Comeback Player of the Year by the Associated Press, Sporting News, and Pro Football Writers of America (PFWA).

Smith was waived on March 5, 2021.

=== Retirement ===
Despite garnering interest from several teams to claim Smith off waivers, he announced his retirement on April 19, 2021. In June, Smith was named the winner of the George Halas Award by the PFWA.

In June 2021, Smith signed a brand partnership with recovery shoe brand Oofos. He credited the shoes for helping with his recovery from his leg injury.

== Career statistics ==
=== NFL ===
Legend
| | Led the league |
| **Bold** | Career high |

==== Regular season ====
| Year | Team | Games | | | Passing | | | | | | | | | Rushing | | | | | Sacks | | Fumbles | |
| Year | Team | GP | GS | Record | Cmp | Att | Pct | Yds | Avg | Lng | TD | Int | Rtg | Att | Yds | Avg | Lng | TD | Sck | SckY | Fum | Lost |
|---|---|---|---|---|---|---|---|---|---|---|---|---|---|---|---|---|---|---|---|---|---|---|
| 2005 | SF | 9 | 7 | 2–5 | 84 | 165 | 50.9 | 875 | 5.3 | 47 | 1 | 11 | 40.8 | 30 | 103 | 3.4 | 19 | 0 | 29 | 185 | **11** | 3 |
| 2006 | SF | 16 | 16 | 7–9 | 257 | 442 | 58.1 | 2,890 | 6.5 | 75 | 16 | **16** | 74.8 | 44 | 147 | 3.3 | 22 | 2 | 35 | 202 | 10 | **5** |
| 2007 | SF | 7 | 7 | 2–5 | 94 | 193 | 48.7 | 914 | 4.7 | 45 | 2 | 4 | 57.2 | 13 | 89 | **6.8** | 25 | 0 | 17 | 121 | 6 | **5** |
| 2008 | SF | 0 | 0 | Did not play due to injury | | | | | | | | | | | | | | | | | | |
| 2009 | SF | 11 | 10 | 5–5 | 225 | 372 | 60.5 | 2,350 | 6.3 | 73 | 18 | 12 | 81.5 | 24 | 51 | 2.1 | 11 | 0 | 22 | 134 | 3 | 1 |
| 2010 | SF | 11 | 10 | 3–7 | 204 | 342 | 59.6 | 2,370 | 6.9 | 62 | 14 | 10 | 82.1 | 18 | 60 | 3.3 | 12 | 0 | 25 | 140 | 4 | 2 |
| 2011 | SF | 16 | 16 | **13–3** | 273 | 445 | 61.3 | 3,144 | 7.1 | 56 | 17 | 5 | 90.7 | 52 | 179 | 3.4 | 14 | 2 | 44 | **263** | 7 | 2 |
| 2012 | SF | 10 | 9 | 6–2–1 | 153 | 218 | **70.2** | 1,737 | **8.0** | 55 | 13 | 5 | 104.1 | 31 | 132 | 4.3 | 24 | 0 | 24 | 137 | 4 | 1 |
| 2013 | KC | 15 | 15 | 11–4 | 308 | **508** | 60.6 | 3,313 | 6.5 | 71 | 23 | 7 | 89.1 | 76 | 431 | 5.7 | 26 | 1 | 39 | 210 | 7 | 3 |
| 2014 | KC | 15 | 15 | 8–7 | 303 | 464 | 65.3 | 3,265 | 7.0 | 70 | 18 | 6 | 93.4 | 49 | 254 | 5.2 | 25 | 1 | **45** | 229 | 4 | 1 |
| 2015 | KC | 16 | 16 | 11–5 | 307 | 470 | 65.3 | 3,486 | 7.4 | **80** | 20 | 7 | 95.4 | **84** | **498** | 5.9 | 49 | 2 | **45** | 235 | 4 | 0 |
| 2016 | KC | 15 | 15 | 11–4 | 328 | 489 | 67.1 | 3,502 | 7.2 | **80** | 15 | 8 | 91.2 | 48 | 134 | 2.8 | 24 | **5** | 28 | 140 | 7 | 4 |
| 2017 | KC | 15 | 15 | 9–6 | **341** | 505 | 67.5 | **4,042** | **8.0** | 79 | **26** | 5 | **104.7** | 60 | 355 | 5.9 | **70** | 1 | 35 | 207 | 2 | 1 |
| 2018 | WAS | 10 | 10 | 6–4 | 205 | 328 | 62.5 | 2,180 | 6.6 | 52 | 10 | 5 | 85.7 | 41 | 168 | 4.1 | 22 | 1 | 22 | 121 | 6 | 1 |
| 2019 | WAS | 0 | 0 | Did not play due to injury | | | | | | | | | | | | | | | | | | |
| 2020 | WAS | 8 | 6 | 5–1 | 168 | 252 | 66.7 | 1,582 | 6.3 | 68 | 6 | 8 | 78.5 | 10 | 3 | 0.3 | 5 | 0 | 22 | 139 | 2 | 0 |
| Career | | 174 | 167 | 99–67–1 | 3,250 | 5,193 | 62.6 | 35,650 | 6.9 | 80 | 199 | 109 | 86.9 | 580 | 2,604 | 4.5 | 70 | 15 | 432 | 2,463 | 77 | 29 |

==== Postseason ====
| Year | Team | Games | | | Passing | | | | | | | | | Rushing | | | | | Sacks | | Fumbles | |
| Year | Team | GP | GS | Record | Cmp | Att | Pct | Yds | Avg | Lng | TD | Int | Rtg | Att | Yds | Avg | Lng | TD | Sck | SckY | Fum | Lost |
|---|---|---|---|---|---|---|---|---|---|---|---|---|---|---|---|---|---|---|---|---|---|---|
| 2011 | SF | 2 | 2 | 1–1 | 36 | 68 | 52.9 | **495** | 7.3 | 73 | **5** | 0 | 101.0 | 7 | 70 | **10.0** | **28** | **1** | **7** | **53** | **2** | **1** |
| 2012 | SF | 0 | 0 | DNP | | | | | | | | | | | | | | | | | | |
| 2013 | KC | 1 | 1 | 0–1 | 30 | 46 | 65.2 | 378 | **8.2** | **79** | 4 | 0 | **119.7** | 8 | 57 | 7.1 | 16 | 0 | 2 | 15 | 1 | **1** |
| 2015 | KC | 2 | 2 | 1–1 | **46** | **72** | 63.9 | 436 | 6.1 | 48 | 2 | 1 | 84.0 | **14** | **71** | 5.1 | 15 | 0 | 4 | 20 | 0 | 0 |
| 2016 | KC | 1 | 1 | 0–1 | 20 | 34 | 58.8 | 172 | 5.1 | 24 | 1 | 1 | 69.7 | 2 | 9 | 4.5 | 5 | 0 | 1 | 6 | 0 | 0 |
| 2017 | KC | 1 | 1 | 0–1 | 24 | 33 | **72.7** | 264 | 8.0 | 45 | 2 | 0 | 116.2 | 4 | 13 | 3.3 | 11 | 0 | 4 | 8 | 0 | 0 |
| 2020 | WAS | 0 | 0 | Did not play due to injury | | | | | | | | | | | | | | | | | | |
| Career | | 7 | 7 | 2–5 | 156 | 253 | 61.7 | 1,745 | 6.9 | 79 | 14 | 2 | 97.4 | 35 | 220 | 6.3 | 28 | 1 | 18 | 102 | 3 | 2 |

=== College ===
| Season | Team | GP | Passing | | | | | | | Rushing | | |
| Season | Team | GP | Cmp | Att | Pct | Yds | TD | Int | Rtg | Att | Yds | TD |
|---|---|---|---|---|---|---|---|---|---|---|---|---|
| 2002 | Utah | 2 | 2 | 4 | 50.0 | 4 | 0 | 1 | 8.4 | 2 | −11 | 0 |
| 2003 | Utah | 11 | 173 | 266 | 65.0 | 2,247 | 15 | 3 | 152.3 | 149 | 452 | 5 |
| 2004 | Utah | 12 | 214 | 317 | 67.5 | 2,952 | 32 | 4 | 176.1 | 135 | 631 | 10 |
| Total | | 25 | 389 | 587 | 66.3 | 5,203 | 47 | 8 | 164.4 | 286 | 1,072 | 15 |

== Career highlights ==
=== Awards and honors ===
NFL

- NFL Comeback Player of the Year (2020)
- 3× Pro Bowl (2013, 2016, 2017)
- NFL passer rating leader (2017)
- George Halas Award (2021)
- 2× NFL Top 100 — 81st (2016), 81st (2017)
- NFC Offensive Player of the Week (Week 8, 2012)
- AFC Offensive Player of the Week (Week 1, 2017)

College

- Sporting News Player of the Year (2004)
- First-team All-American (2004)
- MW Offensive Player of the Year (2004)
- First-team All-MW (2004)
- Second-team All-MW (2003)

=== NFL records ===
- 158.3 passing rating (perfect game) in Week 15, 2013
- Most passes to start a season without throwing an interception: 287 (2017)

==== 49ers franchise records ====
- Most 4th quarter comeback wins in a single season: 6 (2011)
- Fewest interceptions in a single season: 5 in 2011 (16 starts)
- Most consecutive pass attempts without an interception: 249

==== Chiefs franchise records ====
- Most rushing yards by a quarterback, season: 498 (2015)
- Most consecutive passes without an interception: 312 (Week 3–Week 14, 2015)
- Highest completion percentage, season (min. 200 attempts): 67.5 (2017)

== Broadcasting career ==
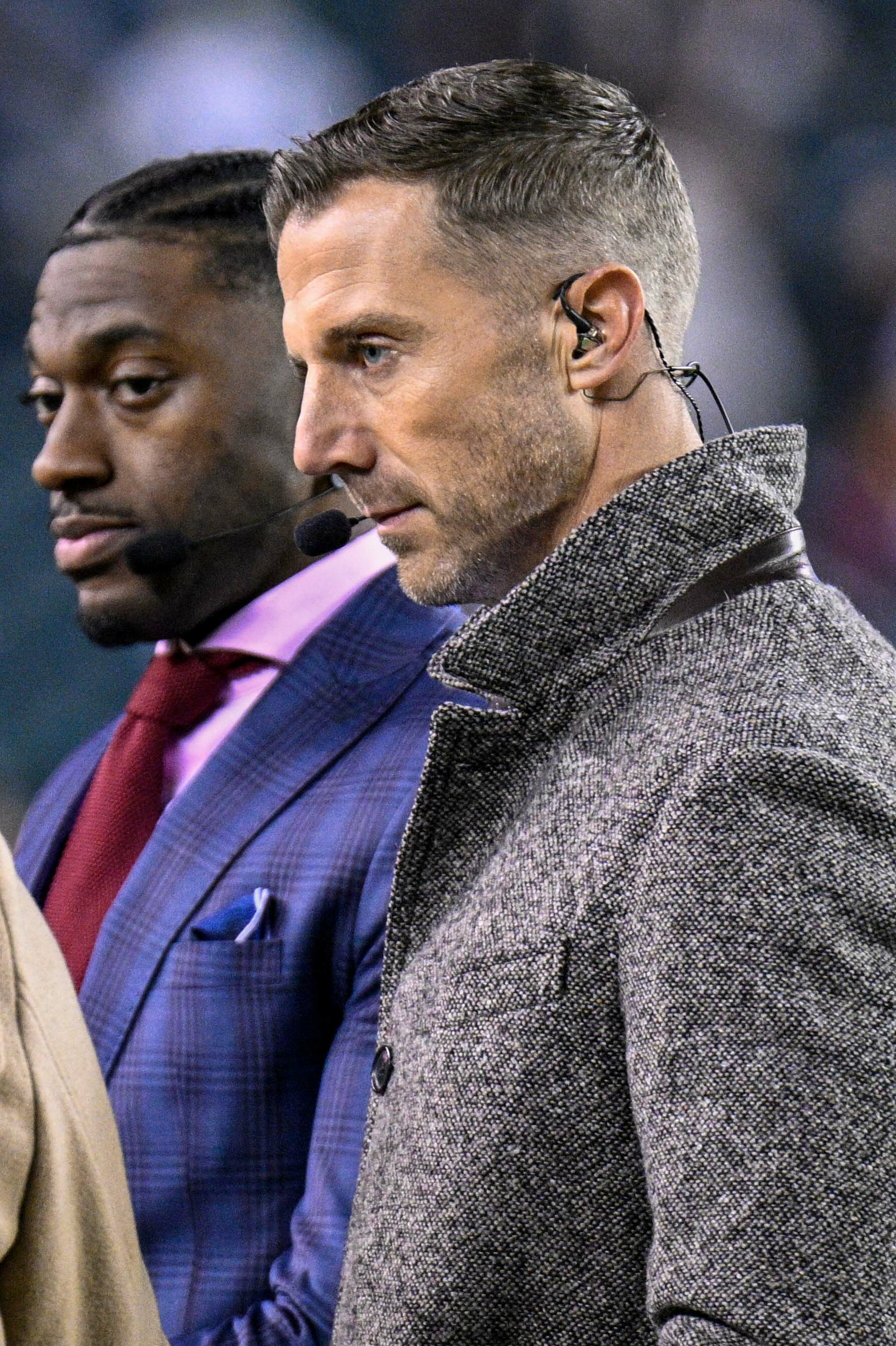
Smith (right) serving as a Monday Night Countdown panelist in 2022

Smith joined ESPN in August 2021 to serve as an NFL analyst for SportsCenter and Monday Night Countdown, among other programs for the network.

== Personal life ==
Smith married former Oakland Raiders cheerleader Elizabeth Barry in 2009. They have two sons and a daughter.

Smith has a brother and two sisters. One of his great-grandfathers was an Austrian immigrant of Serbian descent who immigrated to the U.S. from the Austro-Hungarian Empire at age 12. To honor his great-grandfather, Smith, his brother, and his father are each tattooed with four firesteels, the traditional Serbian cross. Smith's uncle, John L. Smith, was a college football head coach until 2018, and his cousin, Chris Shelton, is a former Major League Baseball player.

In 2007, Smith founded the Alex Smith Foundation and the Alex Smith Guardian Scholars Program, which helps send foster teens to college. He started the program with $500,000, and continues to personally fund the majority of the charity. The Boston Globe held up Smith's foundation as a model charity that properly allocated its funding, noting that it raised over $800,000 from 2008 to 2010 and spent 91 percent of the funds on scholarships and grants.

In 2014, Smith was awarded an honorary doctor of humane letters degree by the University of Utah, where he also delivered the commencement speech for the graduating class.

In 2021, Smith started a collection called Just Live with a clothing brand; all of the proceeds from the collection are donated to the Center for the Intrepid where he spent most of his rehabilitation process.

In 2026, Smith joined Saint Francis High School as the quarterbacks coach, alongside his former San Francisco 49ers teammate Bryant Young who serves as the defensive linemen coach.
