= Carbuncle (pathology) =

Cluster of boils caused by bacterial infection

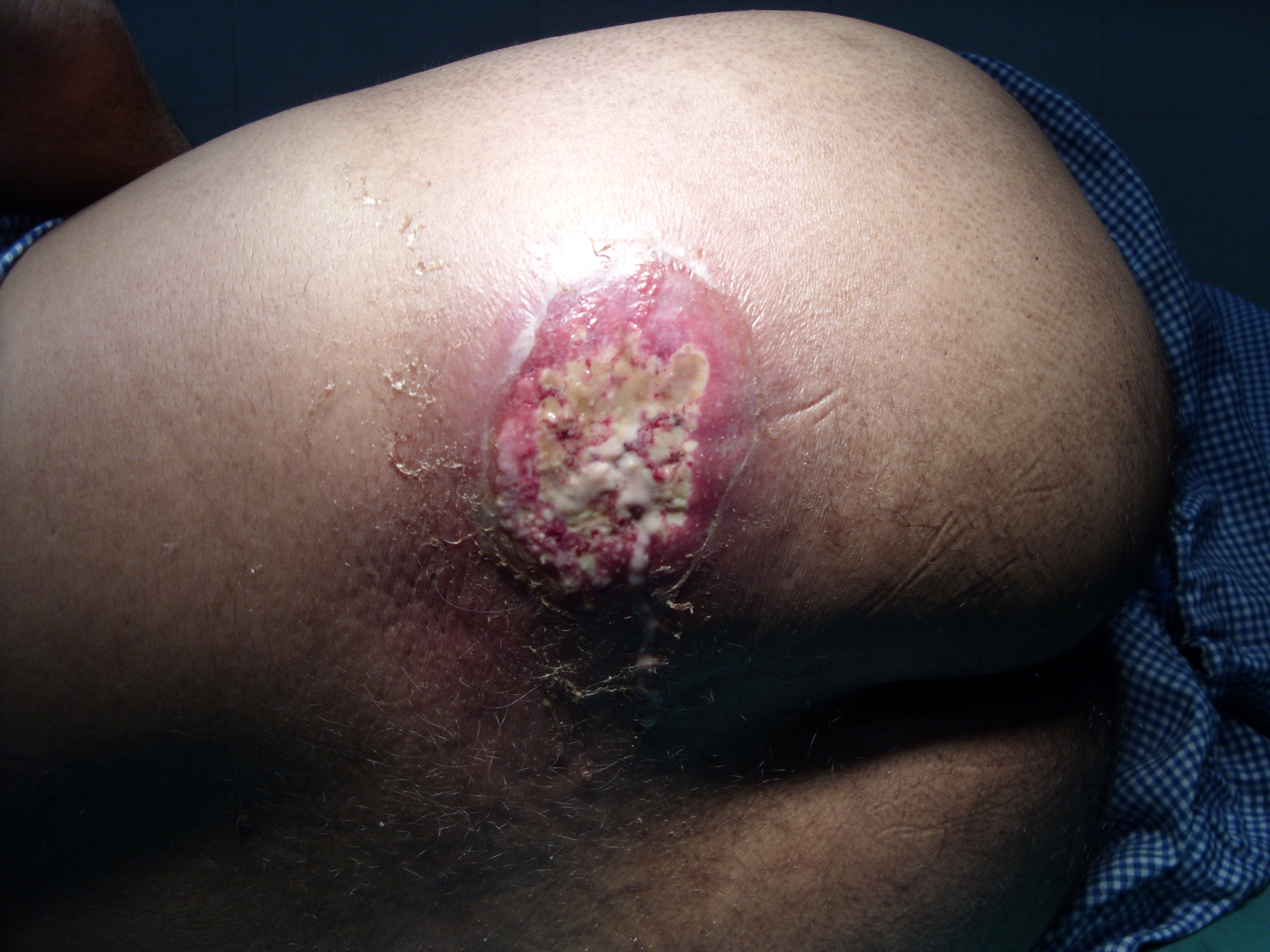
- Carbuncle on buttock of a diabetic person
- Pronunciation: /ˈkɑːrbʌŋkəl/
- Specialty: Dermatology

A carbuncle is a cluster of boils caused by bacterial infection. It is most commonly started by Staphylococcus aureus or Streptococcus pyogenes. The presence of a carbuncle is a sign that the immune system is active and fighting the infection. Carbuncles are contagious, so they may spread to other areas of the body and other people, hence why those living in the same residence may develop carbuncles at the same time. In the early 21st century, infection involving methicillin-resistant Staphylococcus aureus (MRSA) has become more common.

== Signs and symptoms ==
A carbuncle is a cluster of several boils: typically filled with purulent exudate (dead neutrophils, phagocytized bacteria, and other cellular components). Fluid may freely drain from the carbuncle, but intervention involving an incision and drainage procedure may be needed. Carbuncles may develop anywhere; they are most common on the back and the nape of the neck.

A carbuncle is palpable and can range in size from as small as a pea to as large as a golf ball. The surrounding area is indurated. Later, skin on the centre of the carbuncle softens and peripheral satellite vesicles appear; these rupture, discharging pus, and give rise to cribriform appearance. As the impending infection develops, itching may occur. There may be localized erythema or skin irritation, and the area may be painful when touched. Sometimes more severe symptoms may occur, such as fatigue, fever, chills, and general malaise as the body fights the infection.

== Diagnosis ==
A carbuncle can be diagnosed by your doctor: typically by simply observing the boil.

Your doctor may also send a sample of pus to the lab for testing—this can be proven useful if the infection does not respond well to typical treatment, or if the infection is recurring. Lab testing is also used to diagnose carbuncles, for many types of the bacteria that cause this infection have grown to become resistant to common antibiotics. By getting samples of the carbuncle tested in a lab, doctors can prescribe the best possible antibiotic to fend off bacteria.

== Cause ==
Carbuncles are caused by bacteria—commonly Staphylococcus aureus or Streptococcus pyogenes. They are an accumulation of boils that are more likely to occur if someone has a long-term condition that affects one's immune system, such as diabetes or HIV. Carbuncles are also more likely to occur in middle-aged men, people who have been in contact with someone with boils or a carbuncle, people with some skin conditions like eczema, those who take medication like steroids, and people with obesity or malnutrition.

This infection will typically be caused by a small tear on the skin, which may be started by an insect bite. This is due to bacteria being commonly found on the skin. The bacteria can enter through small openings and infect the area. Once there is a build up of pus, the immune system will counteract the infection by forming a boil, leading to the formation of a carbuncle.

== Treatment ==
Small carbuncles can be treated at home by putting a warm compress on the boil in order to alleviate discomfort and pain. Warm compresses can also bolster natural drainage from the boil. Washing your hands every time you interact with a carbuncle and washing all clothes that come in contact with it will slow down the spread of infection. Also, wash the boil every day with antibacterial soap to stunt the spread of infection. Keep the boil dry in order to speed up the healing process.

If there is a larger carbuncle, however, a doctor may prescribe antibiotics to heal the boil and prevent it from reappearing. Another method for healing large carbuncles is to create an incision in the boil—do not perform this without the guidance of a licensed doctor—in order to speed up the process of drainage. Deeper infections that cannot be completely drained will meet sterilized gauze that will soak up leftover unwanted moisture and pus.

In order to speed up the healing process, do not:

- squeeze the boil
- poke or puncture the boil
- scratch the boil
- let bandages that have touched the boil sit out
- touch others who have the boil
- touch others if you have the boil
- wear tight clothing on the boil or in areas prone to boils
- let the boil stay wet

== Society and culture ==
=== Etymology ===
The word 'carbuncle' is believed to have originated from the Latin: carbunculus, originally a small coal; diminutive of carbon-, carbo: charcoal or ember, but also a carbuncle stone, "precious stones of a red or fiery colour", usually garnets.

=== Metaphor: the "monstrous carbuncle" ===
In 1984, Charles III—then, Prince of Wales—described the proposed Sainsbury Wing extension to the National Gallery in London as a "monstrous carbuncle on the face of a much-loved and elegant friend"—a term he has since used to describe other pieces of architecture.
