= Oofos =

American multinational recovery footwear company

- Type: Private
- Industry: Clothing
- Founded: 2011; 15 years ago
- Founders: Lou Panaccione, Paul Brown, Juan Diaz, and Steve Liggett
- Headquarters: Braintree, Massachusetts, U.S.
- Area served: Worldwide
- Key people: Lou Panaccione (CEO)
- Products: Shoes
- Website: www.oofos.com

Oofos (stylized OOFOS) is an American multinational company that manufactures recovery footwear. Headquartered in Braintree, Massachusetts, it was founded in 2011.

== History ==
OOFOS was founded in 2011 by a team of footwear industry veterans that included Lou Panaccione, Paul Brown, Juan Diaz, and Steve Liggett. The company originally sold its footwear direct to consumer, through Amazon, and wholesale. By 2023, the brand was selling in 32 countries, and expanded from specialty running shops to include REI, DSW and Nordstrom. In June 2025, the company began opening retail stores in the US.

== Products and technology ==
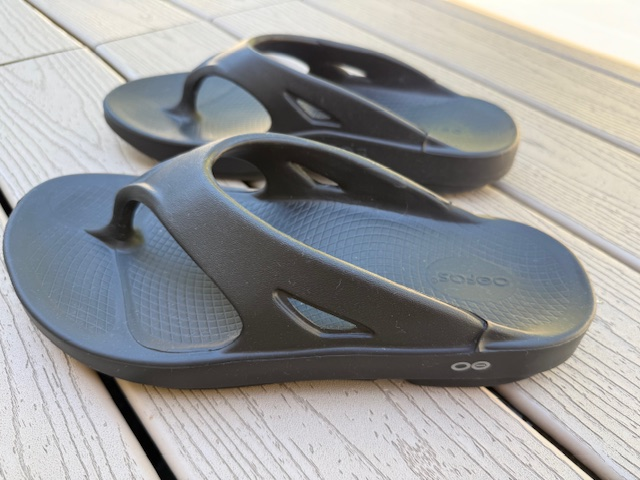
OOFOS recovery sandals

OOFOS manufactures recovery sandals and shoes designed to help lessen the stress on joints. The company markets OOfoam, foam technology designed to absorb impacts and help wearers feel better post performance. The foam is used to manufacture a variety of men's and women's styles, including sandals, shoes, clogs and slippers.

== Advertising ==
In 2020, former NFL and MLB star Deion Sanders became an OOFOS brand ambassador. Sanders credited his OOFOS shoes with helping with the lingering pain he felt from his years as a pro athlete. In June 2021, the company signed a brand partnership with former NFL quarterback Alex Smith. In 2018, Smith had suffered a near career-ending injury, and credited OOFOS shoes for helping with his recovery. In September 2022, former Las Vegas Raiders NFL quarterback Derek Carr also became a brand ambassador for OOFOS. As of September 2022, OOFOS was also the official recovery shoe for the LA Raiders. South Carolina Gamecocks women's basketball head coach Dawn Staley is also an OOFOS brand ambassador.

Other partnerships have included USA Gymnastics, athletic company EXOS, the NWHL, and the U.S. Ski & Snowboard team.

== Philanthropy ==
In 2015, OOFOS launched Project Pink to support breast cancer research, after Duncan Finigan, OOFOS' global head of brand management and marketing, was diagnosed with breast cancer. The company reportedly donates a percentage of its proceeds to breast cancer research.
