= Ubi pus, ibi evacua =

Medical Latin saying meaning, "Where there is pus, evacuate it."

Ubi pus, ibi evacua is a Latin aphorism or adage, often cited in medicine, meaning "where [there is] pus, there evacuate [it]". It refers to what clinicians should do when there is a collection of pus in the body; that is, to create an opening for it to evacuate. A contemporary expression of the same sentiment is also used: "if there's pus about, let it out" or "let no sun set on an undrained abscess".

Examples include what an otorhinolaryngologist will often do in case of a child with chronic recurring otitis media: Insert a grommet in the eardrum to help evacuate the excess fluid within. Antibiotics often have difficulties getting into an abscess, and do not work well because of a low pH; evacuation through a drainage-channel, on the other hand, will remove a large number of bacteria and thus greatly aid the resolution of the infection.

== See also ==
- Incision and drainage
- Debridement
