= Pancreatic abscess =

- Specialty: Gastroenterology

Pancreatic abscess is a late complication of acute necrotizing pancreatitis, occurring more than 4 weeks after the initial attack. A pancreatic abscess is a collection of pus resulting from tissue necrosis, liquefaction, and infection. It is estimated that approximately 3% of the patients with acute pancreatitis will develop an abscess.

According to the Balthazar and Ranson's radiographic staging criteria, patients with a normal pancreas, an enlargement that is focal or diffuse, mild peripancreatic inflammations or a single collection of fluid (pseudocyst) have less than 2% chances of developing an abscess. However, the probability of developing an abscess increases to nearly 60% in patients with more than two pseudocysts and gas within the pancreas.

== Signs and symptoms ==
Patients with pancreatic abscesses may experience abdominal pain, chills and fever or the inability to eat. Whereas some patients present an abdominal mass, others do not. Nausea and vomiting may also occur.

=== Complications ===
An unremoved infected abscess may lead to sepsis. Also, multiple abscesses may occur. Other complications may include fistula formation and recurrent pancreatitis.

== Causes ==
Pancreatic abscesses usually develop in patients with pancreatic pseudocysts that become infected. They may also form as a result of fibrous wall formation around fluid collections or penetrating peptic ulcers. Other causes include gall stones or alcohol consumption and, in rare cases, drugs, blunt trauma and following extension abscess from nearby structures.

== Diagnosis ==
Most patients who develop pancreatic abscesses have had pancreatitis, so a complete medical history is required as a first step in diagnosing abscesses. On the other hand, a white blood cell count is the only laboratory test that may indicate the presence of an abscess.

Some of the imaging tests are more commonly used to diagnose this condition. Abdominal CT scans, MRIs and ultrasounds are helpful in providing clear images of the inside of the abdomen and successfully used in the diagnosing process. These tests may reveal the presence of infected necrosis which has not yet developed into an abscess and as a result, doctors usually order repeated imaging tests in patients with acute pancreatitis whose abdominal pain worsens and who develop signs of abdominal obstruction. Also, it is recommended that patients who have a prolonged clinical response are tested repeatedly as a prevention method to avoid the development of an abscess that may rupture.

== Prevention ==
In some cases, abscesses may be prevented by draining an existing pseudocyst which is likely to become inflamed. However, in most cases the developing of abscesses cannot be prevented.

== Treatment ==
Antibiotics are commonly used as a curing method for pancreatic abscesses although their role remains controversial. Prophylactic antibiotics are normally chosen based on the type of flora and the degree of antibiotic penetration into the abscess. Pancreatic abscesses are more likely to host enteric organisms and pathogens such as E. coli, Klebsiella pneumoniae, Enterococcus faecalis, Staphylococcus aureus, Pseudomonas aeruginosa, Proteus mirabilis, and Streptococcus species. Medical therapy is usually given to people whose general health status does not allow surgery. On the other hand, antibiotics are not recommended in patients with pancreatitis, unless the presence of an infected abscess has been proved.

Although there have been reported cases of patients who were given medical treatment and survived, primary drainage of the abscess is the main treatment used to cure this condition. Drainage usually involves a surgical procedure. It has been shown that CT-guided drainage brought inferior results than open drainage. Hence, open surgical procedure is preferred to successfully remove the abscess. However, CT-guided drainage is the option treatment for patients who may not tolerate an open procedure. Endoscopic treatment is at the same time a treatment option that increased in popularity over the last years.

== Prognosis ==
The outlook is generally based on the severity of the infection. It is however a severe complication which may result in the death of the patient if the appropriate treatment is not administered. Patients are at risk of sepsis and multiple organ failure and in cases in which the infected abscess is not removed through surgery, the mortality rate can reach 100%.
