= Incision and drainage =

Minor surgical procedure to release pus or pressure under skin

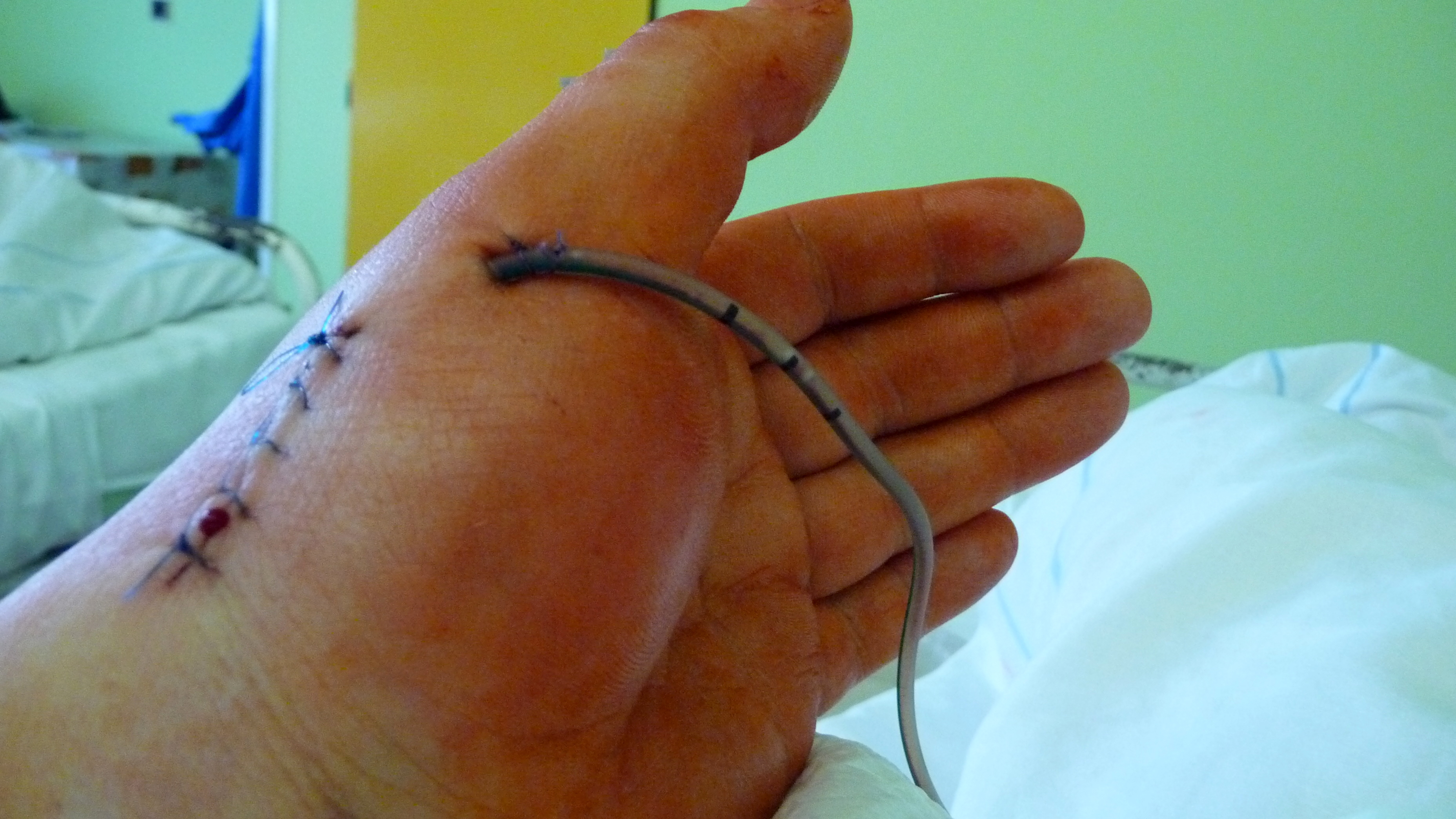
- Hand with sutures and surgical drain
- Other names: Clinical lancing

Drainage (medical)
- ICD-10-PCS: 0?9
- MeSH: D004322

Incision and drainage (I&D), also known as clinical lancing, are minor surgical procedures to release pus or pressure built up under the skin, such as from an abscess, boil, or infected paranasal sinus. It is performed by treating the area with an antiseptic, such as iodine-based solution, and then making a small incision to puncture the skin using a sterile instrument such as a sharp needle or a pointed scalpel. This allows the pus to escape by draining out through the incision.

Good medical practice for large abdominal abscesses requires insertion of a drainage tube, preceded by insertion of a peripherally inserted central catheter line to enable readiness of treatment for possible septic shock.

== Adjunct antibiotics ==
Uncomplicated cutaneous abscesses do not necessarily require antibiotics after successful drainage. Adjunct antibiotics for uncomplicated cutaneous abscesses have a minimal increase in the resolution rate, while significantly increasing the prevalence of adverse medication side effects.

It is reasonable to forego antibiotics in patients who meet all of the following criteria:

- Single abscess
- Abscess less than 2 centimeters
- No or minimal surrounding cellulitis
- No systemic signs of toxicity (fever greater than 100.4 Fahrenheit, hypotension, sustained tachycardia)
- No immunosuppression or risk factors for infective endocarditis
- No indwelling medical devices
- No exposure to situations that could increase spread to others (e.g. contact sports, military barracks)

== In incisional abscesses ==
For incisional abscesses, it is recommended that incision and drainage is followed by covering the area with a thin layer of gauze followed by sterile dressing. The dressing should be changed and the wound irrigated with normal saline at least twice each day. In addition, it is recommended to administer an antibiotic active against staphylococci and streptococci, preferably vancomycin when there is a risk of methicillin-resistant Staphylococcus aureus. The wound can be allowed to close by secondary intention. Alternatively, if the infection is cleared and healthy granulation tissue is evident at the base of the wound, the edges of the incision may be reapproximated, such as by using butterfly stitches, staples or sutures.

== See also ==
- Drain (surgery)
- Ubi pus, ibi evacua
