= Abscess of thymus =

- Specialty: Endocrinology

An abscess of the thymus (also known as "Dubois' abscesses") is a condition that is one of many possible causes of cysts in the mediastinum.

It can present with chest pain behind the sternum.

It can be associated with congenital syphilis.
