= Skin sloughing =

Shedding dead surface cells off the skin

Skin sloughing is the process of shedding dead surface cells from the skin. It is most associated with cosmetic skin maintenance via exfoliation, but can also occur biologically or for medical reasons.

== Cellular process ==
=== Skin composition ===
Keratinocytes are the main cell type of the epidermis. They form several layers of the skin. Life for a keratinocyte begins at the stratum basale layer. Cells here proliferate and move through the stratum spinosum and stratum granulosum. The topmost layer is called the stratum corneum. During sloughing, it is this layer that is removed. As cells progress through the various layers to reach the stratum corneum, they undergo a process called cornification which transforms keratinocytes to corneocytes, effectively killing them. The resulting cell is flat, has no nucleus, and is surrounded by a cellular envelope.

=== Regulation of the epidermis ===
Calcium is the main regulator of keratinocytes and cornification. A calcium concentration gradient differentiates the layers of skin with the lowest concentration being in the stratum basale. Calcium is also involved in different signaling pathways within skin cells. Phospholipase C triggers the release of intracellular calcium through inositol trisphosphate (IP3) and diacylglycerol (DAG). This increase of calcium then induces Protein Kinase C (PKC) which can alter keratinocyte transcription and further contribute to differentiation of the epidermis. Various other calcium channels and pathways are also used to form the skin.

Ultimately, the most superficial layer of the epidermis is designed as a barrier of dead keratinocytes which can then be sloughed away with little impact on the lower skin layers for many different reasons.

== Causes ==
Intentional skin sloughing usually occurs as a result of cosmetic exfoliation, however, skin sloughing can also be the result of a medical condition or disease.

=== Skin conditions ===
Common, nonthreatening skin conditions can cause sloughing.

==== Dry skin ====
Dry skin can medically be considered xeroderma. Although many forms of xeroderma exist, an individual need not be diagnosed with a disease to experience skin sloughing from dry skin. Dry skin can be a result of genetics. Harsh environments can lead to dry skin. These include exposure to excessively hot or cold temperatures and lack of humidity in the air.

==== Hyperhidrosis ====
Hyperhidrosis, or excessive sweating, can result in the peeling or sloughing of skin.

==== Sunburns ====
Sunburns transmit UVB to keratinocytes which causes them to undergo apoptosis. UVB radiation is dangerous as it can lead to DNA damage as well as damage of tumor-suppressor pro-apoptotic signaling pathways. The formation of sunburn cells is in response to the damage done by UVB exposure. Sunburned cells are those which have initiated apoptosis. The programmed cell death prevents the activity of damaged DNA or pathways that could otherwise lead to cancer. In the process, however, keratinocytes are killed. If the keratinocytes that apoptose are in the lowest layer of the skin, this can be an issue. Typically, however, keratinocytes in higher layers are able to slough away normally. The skin peeling that occurs as sunburns heal is due to this process.

=== Infections ===
Fungal infections that lead to this condition include ringworm, athlete's foot, and jock itch. Most fungal infections related to skin sloughing are caused by dermatophytes. Because this type of fungi require keratin to grow, they target the epidermis. The more superficial layers of the dermis often serve as a protective barrier against these fungi because they are dry and typically dead. If fungi are able to infect, however, it can cause inflammation in the skin and patches similar to psoriasis.

Bacterial infections include toxic shock syndrome, staph infection, and scarlet fever.

=== Diseases ===
==== Dermatitis ====
Dermatitis, or skin inflammation, involves skin peeling. Atopic dermatitis (or eczema) is the most common inflammatory skin disease. Skin may slough in a peeling fashion. Contact dermatitis arises from contact with a skin irritant. The ensuing irritation can cause sores and skin sloughing. Seborrheic dermatitis is associated with skin shedding through dandruff.

==== Psoriasis ====
Psoriasis is the proliferation of keratinocytes. There are several factors that can contribute to the development of psoriasis. A prevalent mechanism of disease expression involves the malfunction and dysregulation of Receptor tyrosine kinase, whose abnormal hyper-activity activates other cell signaling pathways and eventually MAP kinase. This increases transcription and results in cell proliferation. Generally, psoriasis affects innate and adaptive immune system cells. Cells that are impacted in psoriasis include dendritic cells, T lymphocytes, and keratinocytes. Depending on the stage of the disease, the impacts may be larger on different cell types. The proliferation of epidermal cells is associated with an increase in skin sloughing.

==== Lymphoma ====
Cutaneous T cell lymphoma and non-Hodgkin's lymphoma may include skin sloughing as a side effect. Cutaneous T cell lymphoma is a varying category of cancers in the lymph system. The effects of these lymphomas on the skin typically progress with the disease. It is most common to experience patches or plaques on the skin. The initial sloughing of the skin in this lymphoma can be confused for nonthreatening inflammatory conditions due to the lack of cancer cells in the affected areas.

==== Stevens Johnson Syndrome ====
Also known as toxic epidermal necrolysis, Stevens Johnson Syndrome causes entire sheets of skin to be lost. Apoptosis of associated cells in the epidermis initiates the process.

== Treatment ==
Certain conditions should be treated with medication, but skin sloughing caused by dry skin may be treated without medical intervention. Dry skin can be treated with moisturizers. The least irritating to the skin are typically unscented.

Individuals prone to dry skin or skin sloughing may use a number of methods to prevent the condition in the first place. Decreasing exposure to harsh environments can decrease dry, peeling skin.

- Avoid extreme heat: Showering or bathing should be done with warm water as opposed to hot. Additionally, heaters and fires produce dry heat. It is best to keep some distance from these heat sources.
- Avoid extreme cold: This can be done by wearing protective clothing, such as gloves, when faced with cold environments.
- Avoid dryness: Humidifying the air can help to alleviate dry conditions.

If professional help is necessary, individuals can visit a dermatologist.

== See also ==
- Desquamation
