= Pus =

Fluid produced by inflammatory infection

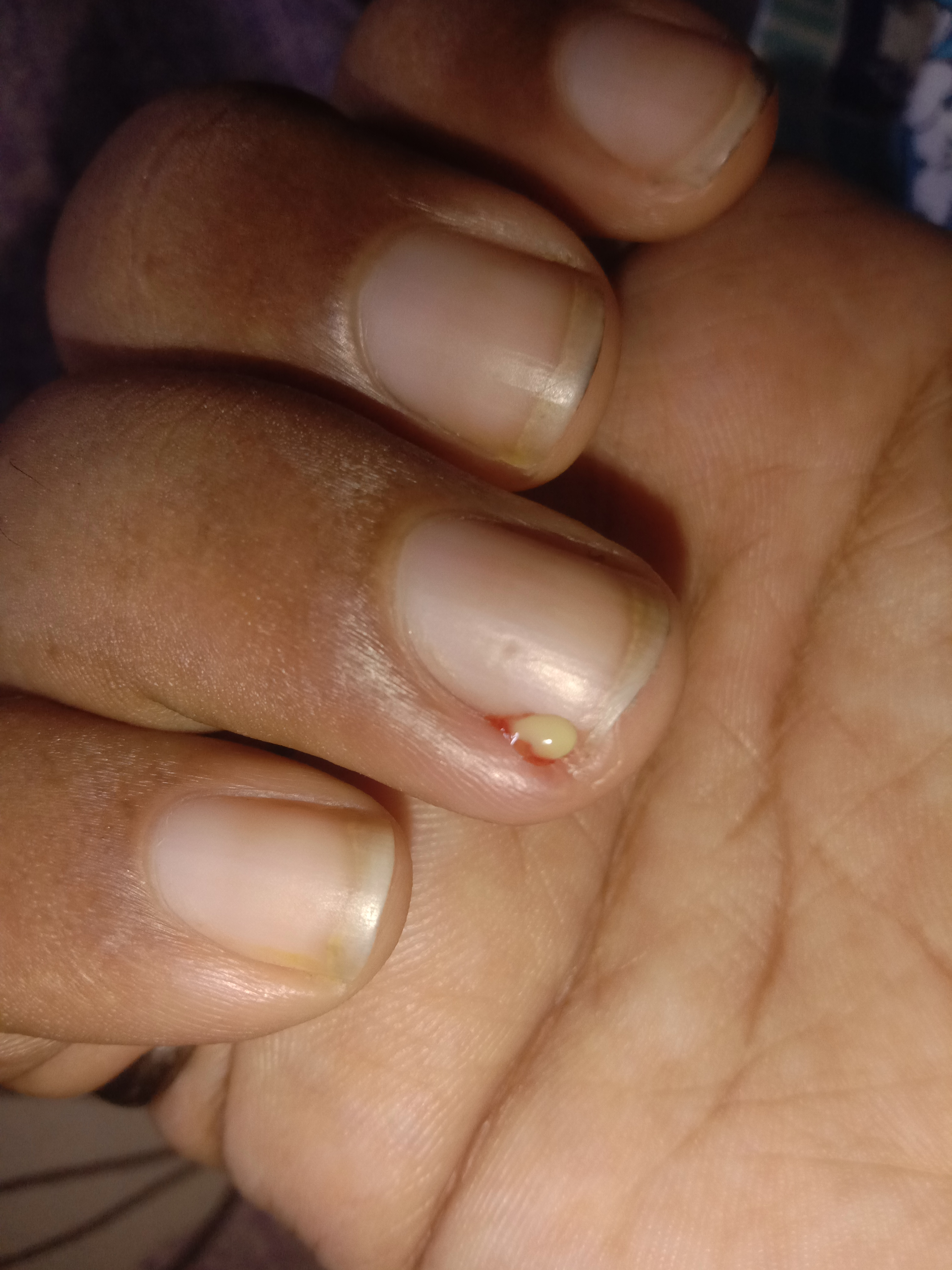
- Pus with blood coming out of ring finger
- Specialty: Infectious disease

Pus is an exudate, typically white-yellow, yellow, or yellow-brown, formed at the site of inflammation during infections, regardless of cause. An accumulation of pus in an enclosed tissue space is known as an abscess, a visible collection of pus within or beneath the epidermis is known as a pustule, pimple or spot, and a similar collection of pus around a hair follicle, is known as a boil.

== Terminology ==
Suppuration is the formation or discharge of pus or may refer to pus itself. The adjectives purulent and suppurative describe the characteristic of containing, relating to, consisting of, or being pus or being related to suppuration. For example, purulent discharge is synonymous with pus while mucopurulent discharge refers to exudate containing both mucus and pus. Seropurulent fluid or discharge contains both serum and pus. A wound or lesion may be described as suppurative or purulent if contains or expresses pus. Pyogenic means producing, generating, or characterized by the expression of pus. The term is often used to describe pyogenic bacteria, organisms whose infections frequently result in pus formation. A pyogenic infection is an infection that is characterized by severe local inflammation, usually with pus formation, generally caused by one of the pyogenic bacteria. The adjective pussy (pronounced /ˈpʌsi/; comparative: pussier, superlative: pussiest) can also refer to pus. This usage is uncommon relative to the common meanings of the homograph pussy.

== Description ==
Pus consists of a thin, protein-rich fluid (historically known as liquor puris) and dead leukocytes (white blood cells) from the body's immune response (mostly neutrophils). During infection, T helper cells release cytokines, which trigger neutrophils to seek the site of infection by chemotaxis. There, the neutrophils release granules, which destroy the bacteria. The bacteria resist the immune response by releasing toxins called leukocidins. As the neutrophils die off from toxins and old age, they are destroyed by macrophages, forming the viscous pus. Bacteria that cause pus are called pyogenic.

Although pus is normally of a whitish-yellow hue, changes in the color can be observed under certain circumstances. Pus is sometimes green because of the presence of myeloperoxidase, an intensely green antibacterial protein produced by some types of white blood cells. Green, foul-smelling pus is found in certain infections of Pseudomonas aeruginosa. The greenish color is a result of the bacterial pigment pyocyanin that it produces. Amoebic abscesses of the liver produce brownish pus, which is described as looking like "anchovy paste". Pus from anaerobic infections can more often have a foul odor.

In almost all cases when there is a collection of pus in the body, a clinician will try to create an opening to drain it. This principle has been distilled into the famous Latin aphorism "Ubi pus, ibi evacua" ("Where there is pus, evacuate it").

Some disease processes caused by pyogenic infections are impetigo, osteomyelitis, septic arthritis and necrotizing fasciitis.

An abscess is an enclosed collection of pus.

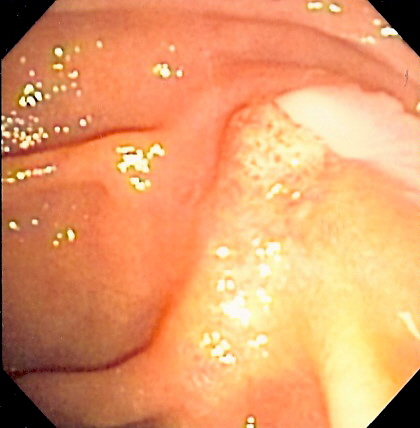
Duodenoscopy image of hepatopancreatic ampulla with pus exuding from it, indicative of cholangitis

== Pyogenic bacteria ==
Many species of bacteria may be involved in the production of pus. The most commonly found include:

- Staphylococcus aureus
- Staphylococcus epidermidis
- Streptococcus pyogenes
- Escherichia coli (Bacillus coli communis)
- Streptococcus pneumoniae (Fraenkel's pneumococcus)
- Klebsiella pneumoniae (Friedländer's bacillus)
- Salmonella typhi (Bacillus typhosus)
- Pseudomonas aeruginosa
- Neisseria gonorrhoeae
- Actinomyces
- Burkholderia mallei (Glanders bacillus)
- Mycobacterium tuberculosis (tubercle bacillus)

Staphylococcus aureus bacteria is the most common cause of boils.

== Historical terminology ==
In the pre-asepsis era, surgeon Frederick Treves (1853–1923) wrote, "Practically all major wounds suppurated. Pus was the most common subject of converse [among surgeons], because it was the most prominent feature in the surgeon's work. It was classified according to degrees of vileness." But pus of the right kind was considered desirable. "If a patient was lucky ... a thick cream-colored odorless fluid would appear within five or six days"; such "laudable" pus was considered "a sure sign that the wound would heal" because it meant "Nature has put up a bold fight against the invader". "On the other hand, if the pus gradually became watery, blood tinged and foul smelling, it was designated 'sanious' [or 'ill-conditioned' ] and the wound condition was considered unfavorable". It later came to be understood that "laudable" pus generally implied an invasion of relatively benign staphylococcus, while "ill-conditioned" pus usually meant the more dangerous streptococcus was present.

== See also ==
- Pyoderma
- Serous fluid
- Carbuncle
- Phlegmon
- Empyema
