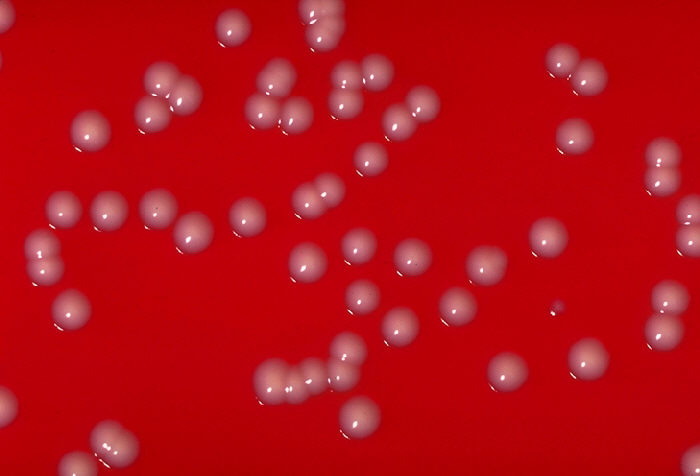
- Corynebacterium ulcerans colonies on a blood agar plate

Scientific classification
- Domain: Bacteria
- Kingdom: Bacillati
- Phylum: Actinomycetota
- Class: Actinomycetes
- Order: Mycobacteriales
- Family: Corynebacteriaceae; Lehmann and Neumann 1907 (Approved Lists 1980)
- Genus: Corynebacterium; Lehmann and Neumann 1896 (Approved Lists 1980)

Type species
- Corynebacterium diphtheriae (Kruse 1886) Lehmann and Neumann 1896 (Approved Lists 1980)

Species
- See text.

Synonyms
- Bacterionema Gilmour et al. 1961 (Approved Lists 1980); Caseobacter Crombach 1978 (Approved Lists 1980); Turicella Funke et al. 1994

= Corynebacterium =

Genus of bacteria

Corynebacterium (/kɔːˈraɪnəbækˌtɪəriəm, -ˈrɪn-/) is a genus of Gram-positive bacteria and most are aerobic. They are bacilli (rod-shaped), and in some phases of life they are, more specifically, club-shaped, which inspired the genus name (coryneform means "club-shaped").

They are widely distributed in nature in the microbiota of animals (including the human microbiota) and are mostly innocuous, most commonly existing in commensal relationships with their hosts. Some, such as C. glutamicum, are commercially and industrially useful. Others can cause human disease, including, most notably, diphtheria, which is caused by C. diphtheriae. Like various species of microbiota (including their relatives in the genera Arcanobacterium and Trueperella), they are usually not pathogenic, but can occasionally capitalize opportunistically on atypical access to tissues (via wounds) or weakened host defenses.

== Taxonomy ==
The genus Corynebacterium was created by Lehmann and Neumann in 1896 as a taxonomic group to contain the bacterial rods responsible for causing diphtheria. The genus was defined according to morphological characteristics. Based on studies of 16S rRNA, they have been grouped into the subdivision of Gram-positive Eubacteria with high G:C content, with close phylogenetic relationships to Arthrobacter, Mycobacterium, Nocardia, and Streptomyces.

The term comes from Greek κορύνη, korýnē 'club, mace, staff, knobby plant bud or shoot' and βακτήριον, baktḗrion 'little rod'. The term "diphtheroids" is used to represent corynebacteria that are nonpathogenic; for example, C. diphtheriae would be excluded. The term diphtheroid comes from Greek διφθέρα, diphthérā 'prepared hide, leather'.

== Genomics ==
Comparative analysis of corynebacterial genomes has led to the identification of several conserved signature indels (CSIs) that are unique to the genus. Two examples of CSIs are a two-amino-acid insertion in a conserved region of the enzyme phosphoribose diphosphate:decaprenyl-phosphate phosphoribosyltransferase and a three-amino-acid insertion in acetate kinase, both of which are found only in Corynebacterium species. Both of these indels serve as molecular markers for species of the genus Corynebacterium. Additionally, 16 conserved signature proteins, which are uniquely found in Corynebacterium species, have been identified. Three of these have homologs found in the genus Dietzia, which is believed to be the closest related genus to Corynebacterium. In phylogenetic trees based on concatenated protein sequences or 16S rRNA, the genus Corynebacterium forms a distinct clade, within which is a distinct subclade, cluster I. The cluster is made up of the species C. diphtheriae, C. pseudotuberculosis, C. ulcerans, C. aurimucosum, C. glutamicum, and C. efficiens. This cluster is distinguished by several conserved signature indels, such as a two-amino-acid insertion in LepA and a seven- or eight-amino-acid insertions in RpoC. Also, 21 conserved signature proteins are found only in members of cluster I. Another cluster has been proposed, consisting of C. jeikeium and C. urealyticum, which is supported by the presence of 19 distinct conserved signature proteins which are unique to these two species. Corynebacteria have a high G+C content ranging from 46-74 mol%.

== Characteristics ==
The principal features of the genus Corynebacterium were described by Collins and Cummins, for Coryn Taylor in 1986. They are gram-positive, catalase-positive, non-spore-forming, non-motile, rod-shaped bacteria that are straight or slightly curved. Metachromatic granules are usually present representing stored phosphate regions. Their size falls between 2 and 6 μm in length and 0.5 μm in diameter. The bacteria group together in a characteristic way, which has been described as the form of a "V", "palisades", or "Chinese characters". They may also appear elliptical. They are aerobic or facultatively anaerobic, chemoorganotrophs. They are pleomorphic through their lifecycles, they occur in various lengths, and they frequently have thickenings at either end, depending on the surrounding conditions.

Some corynebacteria are lipophilic (such as CDC coryneform groups F-1 and G, C. accolens, C. afermentans subsp. lipophilum, C. bovis, C. jeikeium, C. macginleyi, C. uropygiale, and C. urealyticum), but medically relevant corynebacteria are typically not. The nonlipophilic bacteria may be classified as fermentative (such as C. amycolatum; C. argentoratense, members of the C. diphtheriae group, C. glucuronolyticum, C. glutamicum, C. matruchotii, C. minutissimum, C. striatum, and C. xerosis) or nonfermentative (such as C. afermentans subsp. afermentans, C. auris, C. pseudodiphtheriticum, and C. propinquum).

While some Corynebacterium species possess teichoic acid in their cell walls, the plant pathogenic species do not. The cellular envelope of Corynebacterium has esterified short-chain alpha-branched and beta-hydroxy fatty acids that are covalently bound to the peptidoglycan wall, forming a mycolyl-peptidoglycan complex. This contributes to the stress resistance and pathogenicity of Corynebacterium. Most phytopathogenic Corynebacterium cause infections upon injury or wounding of the plant and can cause systemic infections as well. C. fascians is found in perennials and can cause leaf and bulb distortion, bud deformity, and proliferation wilt. C. flaccumfaciens ssp. Flaccumfaciens in field beans can cause wilting, C. flaccumfaciens ssp. Betae in beets can cause silvering of the leaves and wilting, C. ilicis in American holly can cause branch blight, and C. iranicum in wheat can cause yellow slime of the leaves, inflorescences, and leaf spots. C. michiganense ssp. Michiganense in tomato peppers causes wilting and fruit spots, C. michiganense ssp. Insidiosum in alfalfa causes wilting and stunting, and C. tritici in wheat causes yellow slime of leaves and inflorescences. Some Corynebacterium species are considered zoonotic agents which can be transmitted to humans by contact with diseased animals.

=== Cell wall ===
The cell wall is distinctive, with a predominance of mesodiaminopimelic acid in the murein wall and many repetitions of arabinogalactan, as well as corynemycolic acid (a mycolic acid with 22 to 26 carbon atoms), bound by disaccharide bonds called L-Rhap-(1 → 4)--D-GlcNAc-phosphate. These form a complex commonly seen in Corynebacterium species: the mycolyl-AG–peptidoglycan (mAGP). Unlike most corynebacteria, Corynebacterium kroppenstedtii does not contain mycolic acids. 4. The cellular envelope of Corynebacterium has esterified short-chain alpha-branched and beta-hydroxy fatty acids that are covalently bound to the peptidoglycan wall, forming a mycolyl-peptidoglycan complex. This contributes to the stress resistance and pathogenicity of Corynebacterium. The Corynebacteria that are pathogenic to plants lack teichoic acid in their cell walls. Corynebacterium is Gram-positive and teichoic acid is found in the cell walls of Gram-positive bacteria.

=== Culture ===
Corynebacteria grow slowly, even on enriched media. In nutritional requirements, all need biotin to grow. Some strains also need thiamine and PABA. Some of the Corynebacterium species with sequenced genomes have between 2.5 and 3.0 million base pairs. The bacteria grow in Loeffler's medium, blood agar, and trypticase soy agar (TSA). They form small, grayish colonies with a granular appearance, mostly translucent, but with opaque centers, convex, with continuous borders. The color tends to be yellowish-white in Loeffler's medium. In TSA, they can form grey colonies with black centers and dentated borders that either resemble flowers (C. gravis), continuous borders (C. mitis), or a mix between the two forms (C. intermedium).

== Habitat ==
Corynebacterium species occur commonly in nature in soil, water, plants, and food products. The non-diphtheroid Corynebacterium species can even be found in the mucosa and normal skin flora of humans and animals. Unusual habitats, such as the preen gland of birds, have been recently reported for Corynebacterium uropygiale. Some species are known for their pathogenic effects in humans and other animals. Perhaps the most notable one is C. diphtheriae, which acquires the capacity to produce diphtheria toxin only after interacting with a bacteriophage. Other pathogenic species in humans include: C. amycolatum, C. striatum, C. jeikeium, C. urealyticum, and C. xerosis; all of these are important as pathogens in immunosuppressed patients. Pathogenic species in other animals include C. bovis and C. renale. This genus has been found to be part of the human salivary microbiome.

== Role in disease ==
The most notable human infection is diphtheria, caused by C. diphtheriae. It is an acute, contagious infection characterized by pseudomembranes of dead epithelial cells, white blood cells, red blood cells, and fibrin that form around the tonsils and back of the throat. In developed countries, it is an uncommon illness that tends to occur in unvaccinated individuals, especially school-aged children, elderly, neutropenic or immunocompromised patients, and those with prosthetic devices such as prosthetic heart valves, shunts, or catheters. It is more common in developing countries It can occasionally infect wounds, the vulva, the conjunctiva, and the middle ear. It can be spread within a hospital. The virulent and toxigenic strains produce an exotoxin formed by two polypeptide chains, which is itself produced when a bacterium is transformed by a gene from the β prophage.

Some Corynebacterium species are considered zoonotic agents which can be transmitted to humans by contact with diseased animals. Several species cause disease in animals, most notably C. pseudotuberculosis, which causes the disease caseous lymphadenitis, and some are also pathogenic in humans. Some attack healthy hosts, while others tend to attack the immunocompromised. Effects of infection include granulomatous lymphadenopathy, pneumonitis, pharyngitis, skin infections, and endocarditis. Corynebacterial endocarditis is seen most frequently in patients with intravascular devices. Several species of Corynebacterium can cause trichomycosis axillaris. C. striatum may cause axillary odor. C. minutissimum causes erythrasma.

Most phytopathogenic Corynebacterium produce systemic infections in plants that are caused by injury or wounding of the plant and can cause systemic infections as well. C. fascians is found in perennials and can cause leaf and bulb distortion, bud deformity, and proliferation wilt. C. flaccumfaciens ssp. Flaccumfaciens in field beans can cause wilting, C. flaccumfaciens ssp. Betae in beets can cause silvering of the leaves and wilting, C. ilicis in American holly can cause branch blight, and C. iranicum in wheat can cause yellow slime of the leaves, inflorescences, and leaf spots. It is also known that C. michiganense ssp. Michiganense in tomato peppers causes wilting and fruit spots, C. michiganense ssp. Insidiosum in alfalfa causes wilting and stunting, and C. tritici in wheat causes yellow slime of leaves and inflorescences.

== Industrial uses ==
Nonpathogenic species of Corynebacterium are used for important industrial applications, such as the production of amino acids and nucleotides, bioconversion of steroids, degradation of hydrocarbons, cheese aging, and production of enzymes. Some species produce metabolites similar to antibiotics: bacteriocins of the corynecin-linocin type, antitumor agents, etc. One of the most studied species is C. glutamicum, whose name refers to its capacity to produce glutamic acid in aerobic conditions.

L-Lysine production is specific to C. glutamicum in which core metabolic enzymes are manipulated through genetic engineering to drive metabolic flux towards the production of NADPH from the pentose phosphate pathway, and L-4-aspartyl phosphate, the commitment step to the synthesis of L-lysine, lysC, dapA, dapC, and dapF. These enzymes are up-regulated in industry through genetic engineering to ensure adequate amounts of lysine precursors are produced to increase metabolic flux. Unwanted side reactions such as threonine and asparagine production can occur if a buildup of intermediates occurs, so scientists have developed mutant strains of C. glutamicum through PCR engineering and chemical knockouts to ensure production of side-reaction enzymes are limited. Many genetic manipulations conducted in industry are by traditional cross-over methods or inhibition of transcriptional activators.

Expression of functionally active human epidermal growth factor has been brought about in C. glutamicum, thus demonstrating a potential for industrial-scale production of human proteins. Expressed proteins can be targeted for secretion through either the general secretory pathway or the twin-arginine translocation pathway.

Unlike gram-negative bacteria, the gram-positive Corynebacterium species lack lipopolysaccharides that function as antigenic endotoxins in humans.

== Species ==
Corynebacterium comprises the following species:

- C. accolens Neubauer et al. 1991
- C. afermentans Riegel et al. 1993
- C. alimapuense Claverias et al. 2019
- "C. alkanolyticum" Lee and Reichenbach 2006
- C. ammoniagenes (Cooke and Keith 1927) Collins 1987
- C. amycolatum Collins et al. 1988
- C. anserum Liu et al. 2021
- C. appendicis Yassin et al. 2002
- C. aquatimens Aravena-Román et al. 2012
- C. aquilae Fernández-Garayzábal et al. 2003
- C. argentoratense Riegel et al. 1995
- "C. asperum" De Briel et al. 1992
- C. atrinae Kim et al. 2015
- C. atypicum Hall et al. 2003
- C. aurimucosum Yassin et al. 2002
- C. auris Funke et al. 1995
- C. auriscanis Collins et al. 2000
- C. belfantii Dazas et al. 2018
- C. beticola Abdou 1969 (Approved Lists 1980)
- "C. bouchesdurhonense" Ndongo et al. 2017
- "C. bouchesdurhonense" Lo et al. 2019
- C. bovis Bergey et al. 1923 (Approved Lists 1980)
- C. callunae (Lee and Good 1963) Yamada and Komagata 1972 (Approved Lists 1980)
- C. camporealensis Fernández-Garayzábal et al. 1998
- C. canis Funke et al. 2010
- C. capitovis Collins et al. 2001
- C. casei Brennan et al. 2001
- C. caspium Collins et al. 2004
- C. choanae Busse et al. 2019
- C. ciconiae Fernández-Garayzábal et al. 2004
- C. comes Schaffert et al. 2021
- C. confusum Funke et al. 1998
- C. coyleae Funke et al. 1997
- C. crudilactis Zimmermann et al. 2016
- C. cystitidis Yanagawa and Honda 1978 (Approved Lists 1980)
- "C. defluvii" Yu et al. 2017
- "C. dentalis" Benabdelkader et al. 2020
- C. deserti Zhou et al. 2012
- C. diphtheriae (Kruse 1886) Lehmann and Neumann 1896 (Approved Lists 1980)
- C. doosanense Lee et al. 2009
- C. durum Riegel et al. 1997
- C. efficiens Fudou et al. 2002
- C. endometrii Ballas et al. 2020
- C. epidermidicanis Frischmann et al. 2012
- C. faecale Chen et al. 2016
- C. falsenii Sjödén et al. 1998
- C. felinum Collins et al. 2001
- C. flavescens Barksdale et al. 1979 (Approved Lists 1980)
- C. fournieri corrig. Diop et al. 2018
- C. frankenforstense Wiertz et al. 2013
- C. freiburgense Funke et al. 2009
- C. freneyi Renaud et al. 2001
- C. gerontici Busse et al. 2019
- C. glaucum Yassin et al. 2003
- C. glucuronolyticum Funke et al. 1995
- C. glutamicum (Kinoshita et al. 1958) Abe et al. 1967 (Approved Lists 1980)
- C. glyciniphilum (ex Kubota et al. 1972) Al-Dilaimi et al. 2015
- C. gottingense Atasayar et al. 2017
- C. guangdongense Li et al. 2016
- "C. haemomassiliense" Boxberger et al. 2020
- C. halotolerans Chen et al. 2004
- C. hansenii Renaud et al. 2007
- C. heidelbergense Braun et al. 2021
- C. hindlerae Bernard et al. 2021
- C. humireducens Wu et al. 2011
- "C. ihumii" Padmanabhan et al. 2014
- C. ilicis Mandel et al. 1961 (Approved Lists 1980)
- C. imitans Funke et al. 1997
- "C. incognitum" Boxberger et al. 2021
- C. jeddahense Edouard et al. 2017
- C. jeikeium Jackman et al. 1988
- C. kalinowskii Schaffert et al. 2021
- "C. kefirresidentii" Blasche et al. 2017
- C. kroppenstedtii Collins et al. 1998
- C. kutscheri (Migula 1900) Bergey et al. 1925 (Approved Lists 1980)
- C. lactis Wiertz et al. 2013
- "C. lactofermentum" Gubler et al. 1994
- C. jeikliangguodongiiium Zhu et al. 2020
- C. lipophiloflavum Funke et al. 1997
- C. lizhenjunii Zhou et al. 2021
- C. lowii Bernard et al. 2016
- C. lubricantis Kämpfer et al. 2009
- C. lujinxingii Zhang et al. 2021
- C. macginleyi Riegel et al. 1995
- C. marinum Du et al. 2010
- C. maris Ben-Dov et al. 2009
- C. massiliense Merhej et al. 2009
- C. mastitidis Fernandez-Garayzabal et al. 1997
- C. matruchotii (Mendel 1919) Collins 1983
- C. minutissimum (ex Sarkany et al. 1962) Collins and Jones 1983
- C. mucifaciens Funke et al. 1997
- C. mustelae Funke et al. 2010
- C. mycetoides (ex Castellani 1942) Collins 1983
- C. nasicanis Baumgardt et al. 2015
- "C. neomassiliense" Boxberger et al. 2020
- C. nuruki Shin et al. 2011
- C. occultum Schaffert et al. 2021
- C. oculi Bernard et al. 2016
- C. otitidis (Funke et al. 1994) Baek et al. 2018
- "C. pacaense" Bellali et al. 2019
- "C. parakroppenstedtii" Luo et al. 2022
- "C. parvulum" Nakamura et al. 1983
- C. pelargi Kämpfer et al. 2015
- C. phocae Pascual et al. 1998
- "C. phoceense" Cresci et al. 2016
- C. pilbarense Aravena-Roman et al. 2010
- C. pilosum Yanagawa and Honda 1978 (Approved Lists 1980)
- C. pollutisoli Negi et al. 2016
- C. propinquum Riegel et al. 1994
- "C. provencense" Ndongo et al. 2017
- "C. provencense" Lo et al. 2019
- C. pseudodiphtheriticum Lehmann and Neumann 1896 (Approved Lists 1980)
- "C. pseudokroppenstedtii" Luo et al. 2022
- C. pseudopelargi Busse et al. 2019
- C. pseudotuberculosis (Buchanan 1911) Eberson 1918 (Approved Lists 1980)
- C. pyruviciproducens Tong et al. 2010
- C. qintianiae Zhou et al. 2021
- C. renale (Migula 1900) Ernst 1906 (Approved Lists 1980)
- C. resistens Otsuka et al. 2005
- C. riegelii Funke et al. 1998
- C. rouxii Badell et al. 2020
- C. sanguinis Jaén-Luchoro et al. 2020
- "C. segmentosum" Collins et al. 1998
- "C. senegalense" Ndiaye et al. 2019
- C. silvaticum Dangel et al. 2020
- C. simulans Wattiau et al. 2000
- C. singulare Riegel et al. 1997
- C. sphenisci Goyache et al. 2003
- C. spheniscorum Goyache et al. 2003
- C. sputi Yassin and Siering 2008
- C. stationis (ZoBell and Upham 1944) Bernard et al. 2010
- C. striatum (Chester 1901) Eberson 1918 (Approved Lists 1980)
- C. suicordis Vela et al. 2003
- C. sundsvallense Collins et al. 1999
- C. suranareeae Nantapong et al. 2020
- C. tapiri Baumgardt et al. 2015
- C. terpenotabidum Takeuchi et al. 1999
- C. testudinoris Collins et al. 2001
- C. thomssenii Zimmermann et al. 1998
- C. timonense Merhej et al. 2009
- C. trachiae Kämpfer et al. 2015
- C. tuberculostearicum Feurer et al. 2004
- C. tuscaniense corrig. Riegel et al. 2006
- "C. uberis" Kittl et al. 2022
- C. ulcerans (ex Gilbert and Stewart 1927) Riegel et al. 1995
- C. ulceribovis Yassin 2009
- C. urealyticum Pitcher et al. 1992
- C. ureicelerivorans Yassin 2007
- "C. urinapleomorphum" Morand et al. 2017
- C. urinipleomorphum corrig. Niang et al. 2021
- C. urogenitale Ballas et al. 2020
- C. uropygiale Braun et al. 2016
- C. uterequi Hoyles et al. 2013
- C. variabile corrig. (Müller 1961) Collins 1987
- C. vitaeruminis corrig. (Bechdel et al. 1928) Lanéelle et al. 1980
- C. wankanglinii Zhang et al. 2021
- C. xerosis (Lehmann and Neumann 1896) Lehmann and Neumann 1899 (Approved Lists 1980)
- C. yudongzhengii Zhu et al. 2020
- C. zhongnanshanii Zhang et al. 2021
