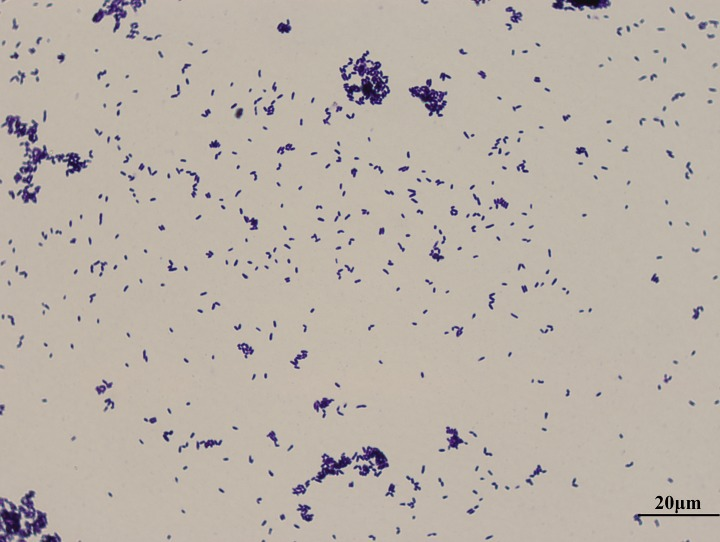
- Gram stain of Corynebacterium xerosis

Scientific classification
- Domain: Bacteria
- Kingdom: Bacillati
- Phylum: Actinomycetota
- Class: Actinomycetes
- Order: Mycobacteriales
- Family: Corynebacteriaceae
- Genus: Corynebacterium
- Species: C. xerosis

Binomial name
- Corynebacterium xerosis (Lehmann and Neumann 1896) Lehmann and Neumann 1899 (Approved Lists 1980)

= Corynebacterium xerosis =

Species of prokaryote

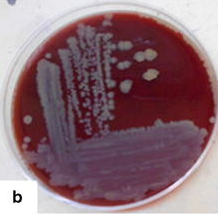
Appearance of C. xerosis colonies on blood agar

Corynebacterium xerosis is a gram-positive, rod-shaped bacterium in the genus Corynebacterium. Although it is frequently a harmless commensal organism living on the skin and in the mucous membranes, C. xerosis is also a clinically relevant opportunistic pathogen that has been attributed to many different infections in animals and humans. However, its actual prominence in human medicine is up for debate due to early difficulties distinguishing it from other Corynebacterium species in clinical isolates.

== Characteristics ==
The genome of C. xerosis is approximately 2.7 million base pairs long with over 2,000 genes encoding proteins and a high G+C content. C. xerosis was found to contain a series of plasmids, one of which confers resistance to common antibiotics such as chloramphenicol, kanamycin, streptomycin, and tetracycline and was named pTP10. This plasmid has since been introduced into Bacillus subtilis and modified to generate several vectors for molecular cloning purposes. In addition to having resistance to many antibiotics itself, at least one strain of C. xerosis also appears capable of producing antimicrobial compounds. These can inhibit bacteria and fungi, but the strength of antimicrobial activity by this strain depends on the carbon sources available. Also, a petroleum ether extract from C. xerosis was found to decrease the growth rate of tumors in mice, increasing their lifespan while being nontoxic to healthy mice.

A study in 1967 confirmed the ability of several strains of C. xerosis to form single-layer "clumps" of cells around gas bubbles when cultures of the bacteria are suspended in buffer solutions at low temperatures with vigorous stirring. This property was attributed to cell surface proteins.

== Clinical Relevance ==
Despite normally being a commensal organism, C. xerosis has been linked to many different opportunistic infections in humans and animals, including endocarditis, sepsis, abscesses, and osteomyelitis. However, it is possible that many early reports of this bacterium may have been cases of misidentification: a 1996 study found that out of 25 clinical isolates originally identified as C. xerosis, all were actually Corynebacterium amycolatum based on a number of biochemical tests which came back as different from the C. xerosis reference strain. Similarly, there is also evidence that some infections attributed to C. xerosis may have been caused by Corynebacterium striatum. Therefore, it is difficult to determine the actual extent of C. xerosis infections as reported in historic literature; however, modern sequencing and phenotypic analyses have allowed for more accurate identification of C. xerosis in clinical infections.
