= Intertrigo =

Inflammatory skin rash within bodily folds

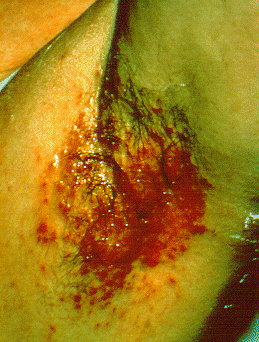
- Axillary intertrigo (bacterial)
- Pronunciation: /ˌɪntərˈtraɪɡoʊ/
- Specialty: Dermatology

Intertrigo, commonly called "skin fold dermatitis", refers to a type of inflammatory rash (dermatitis) of the superficial skin that occurs within a person's body folds. These areas are more susceptible to irritation and subsequent infection due to factors that promote skin breakdown such as moisture, friction, and exposure to bodily secretions and excreta such as sweat, urine, or feces. Areas of the body which are more likely to be affected by intertrigo include the inframammary fold, intergluteal cleft, armpits, and spaces between the fingers or toes. Skin affected by intertrigo is more prone to infection than intact skin.

The term "intertrigo" commonly refers to a secondary infection with bacteria (such as Corynebacterium minutissimum), fungi (such as Candida albicans), or viruses. A frequent manifestation is candidal intertrigo.

Intertrigo occurs more often in warm and humid conditions. Generally, intertrigo is more common in people with a weakened immune system, including children, the elderly, and immunocompromised people. The condition is also more common in people who experience urinary incontinence and decreased ability to move.

== Cause ==
=== Bacterial ===
Bacterial intertrigo can be caused by Streptococci and Corynebacterium minutissimum.

== Diagnosis ==
Intertrigo can be diagnosed clinically by a medical professional after taking a thorough history and performing a detailed physical examination. Many other skin conditions can mimic intertrigo's appearance including erythrasma, inverse psoriasis, scabies, pyoderma, atopic dermatitis, candidiasis, seborrheic dermatitis, and fungal infections of the superficial skin like Tinea versicolor, Tinea corporis and Tinea cruris.

== Treatment ==
Treatment for intertrigo focuses on managing excess moisture, friction, and addressing secondary infections.

Initial management emphasizes prevention and patient education. Patients are often advised to wear loose, breathable clothing (such as cotton) and avoid synthetic fabrics. Moisture-wicking textiles designed for skin folds are also increasingly recommended due to their ability to wick away moisture, promote evaporation, reduce friction, and often provide antimicrobial properties through embedded silver.

Daily skin fold hygiene, including cleansing with a pH-balanced cleanser (avoiding alkaline soaps) and thorough drying, is commonly advised. Skin barrier products are also commonly suggested to protect against both moisture and friction. While specific product selection guidance is limited, barrier creams containing zinc oxide or honey have been used. Absorptive powders like talc or cornstarch are generally no longer recommended.

Secondary infections often require targeted treatment. For fungal and candidal infections, topical antifungals (clotrimazole, nystatin, miconazole) are typical; severe cases may require systemic antifungals (fluconazole, itraconazole). Topical miconazole is sometimes preferred for its additional antibacterial action. Treatment usually lasts at least two weeks. For significant inflammation and itching, combination antifungal/low-potency corticosteroid preparations may be used, though evidence supporting corticosteroids over antifungals alone is limited. Bacterial infections may require topical or systemic antibiotics (e.g., erythromycin), used judiciously due to antimicrobial resistance concerns.

In severe or refractory cases where medical management fails, surgical options may be considered. These include procedures to remove excess skin and tissue, such as panniculectomy (removal of excess abdominal skin and fat) or other body contouring procedures. Breast reduction can be beneficial for women with macromastia, and post-bariatric patients with excess skin folds may also benefit from body contouring procedures to reduce skin-on-skin contact and improve hygiene.

Intertrigo is also a known symptom of vitamin B6 deficiency.

== See also ==
- Diaper rash
- List of skin diseases
