= Lipophilic bacteria =

Bacteria that proliferate in lipids

Lipophilic bacteria (fat-loving bacteria) are bacteria that may proliferate in lipids.

== Types ==
They include lipophilic corynebacteria.

Cutibacterium acnes is a type of lipophilic bacteria, releasing fatty acids and worsening comedones in acne.

However, the group of lipophilic bacteria are not pathogenic, i.e. they do not cause food poisoning or food infection

== Evolutionary reason ==
In terms of evolution, lipophilism can be regarded as fine-tuning the metabolism to lipophilic habitats. Some bacteria do not only accelerate their metabolism using lipids prevailing in their environment, some of them cannot proliferate without external lipid supply. For example, some Corynebacteria, such as Corynebacterium uropygiale, lost their ability to produce certain fatty acids by themselves. On the one hand, this renders the bacteria vulnerable to environmental changes. On the other hand, energy can be saved as there is no need to put effort into lipid synthesis.

== Health risks ==
Most materials in laboratories and health-care centers have small amounts of lipids on their surface, and thus may support the proliferation of lipophilic bacteria. However, since they are not pathogenic, this is not a serious threat.

Lipophilic bacteria may also proliferate in diet fat. However, in modern food industry this is very rare and at worst causes a discoloration of the fat.

== Commercial use ==
Many lipophilic bacteria are a good source of biosurfactants, hence are used commercially, e.g. Bacillus licheniformis. These kinds of bacteria produce biosurfactants which replace chemically produced surfactants. Biosurfactants are degradable unlike the chemical ones.
