= Streptococcal intertrigo =

- Specialty: Dermatology

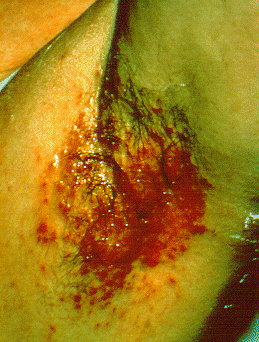
Severe skin inflammation at armpit (warm, moist fold of skin)

Streptococcal intertrigo is a skin condition that is secondary to a streptococcal bacterial infection. It is often seen in infants and young children and can be characterized by a fiery-red color of the skin, foul odor with an absence of satellite lesions, and skin softening (due to moisture) in the neck, armpits or folds of the groin. Newborn children and infants commonly develop intertrigo because of physical features such as deep skin folds, short neck, and flexed posture. Prompt diagnosis by a medical professional and treatment with topical and/or oral antibiotics can effectively relieve symptoms.

== Etiology ==
The main causes of intertrigo are mechanical factors, such as heat and maceration of the skin, and secondary infections, which mostly happens due to moisture build-up in the skin folds, making those areas ideal feeding places for secondary bacterial and fungal infections. A lot of cases of this disease are seen in individuals with diabetes mellitus since they have higher pH levels in their skin folds because of their condition. Given these reasons mentioned above, there have been higher cases of intertrigo in individuals with obesity, diabetes mellitus, immunodeficiency secondary to virus infection, large skin folds, are bedridden, or wear diapers that trap moisture (i.e. babies or older adults using incontinence supplies).

== Signs and symptoms ==
Streptococcal intertrigo commonly presents with a beefy-red, smooth, shiny lesion that has well-defined borders. There are no satellite lesions surrounding the area, and a distinct foul smell is common. The infection may be accompanied by general malaise and a low-grade fever. The folds of the neck are most commonly affected, but other areas with skin folds are also susceptible, including the armpits, groin, and anus.

=== Complications ===
Progression of intertrigo is dependent on the strain of streptococcus responsible for the symptoms. Streptococcal intertrigo can lead to complications if not appropriately diagnosed and treated in a timely manner. It has been reported that bacteremia, or a bacterial infection of the circulating blood, can occur which may require intravenous antibiotic therapy. Streptococcus pyogenes is also known to cause other serious diseases such as meningitis, necrotizing fasciitis, toxic shock syndrome, and osteomyelitis. Skin infections caused by Group A Beta-hemolytic streptococci (GABHS) can also be associated with acute glomerulonephritis, furthering the need for prompt diagnosis and treatment.

== Cause ==
Intertrigo is a skin condition often associated with rashes in deep skin folds with increased friction and moisture exposure. There are various causes that can lead to intertrigo including fungal and viral, although the agent would depend on the nature of the infection whether it be candidal or bacterial. In the case of bacterial infections, the main etiological agents are either group A beta hemolytic streptococci or Staphylococcus aureus. Group A streptococci (GAS) are ubiquitous microorganisms found in the surrounding environment and in the normal skin microbiota. Although there are different severities of infections Group A streptococci can affect individuals, broken skin and wounds allow easier access for colonization by the bacteria. The streptococci family has its own factors that aid in its promotion of infection and severity. Group A streptococci have surface molecules of lipoteichoic acid and protein F which aid in the adhesion to host cells. Once adhered, it releases streptolysin and hyaluronidase to further degrade host tissues, enabling a deeper colonization. In addition to attachment and dissemination factors, Group A streptococci are also encapsulated and have other varying protein factors that defend it from host immunity.

=== Mechanism ===
The most common symptom associated with streptococcal associated intertrigo is erysipelas, an infection of the upper or superficial layers of the skin. This infection is mostly associated with group A beta-hemolytic streptococcal bacteria (GABHS) since they are normally found in the skin flora. This group of bacteria typically invades and affects the lymphatic vessels, often leading to a localized inflammation. The infection can be recognized by tongue-like or irregular extensions of the rash, accompanied by systemic symptoms such as fever, chills, or a general feeling of discomfort. Once in the lymphatic system of the host, GABHS can easily disseminate systemically to produce effects.

=== Risk factors ===
Streptococcal intertrigo occurs when bacteria penetrates the skin. Having an increased amount of skin folds can increase the risk of skin abrasion and erosion, leading to inflammation. Therefore, individuals with obesity, infants, and other factors that increase one's own skin-to-skin contact have an increased risk of intertrigo. Immunocompromised individuals are also at a greater risk for intertrigo since they are more susceptible to infection from any foreign pathogen. Environmental factors also play a role in increasing the risk of this condition. Living in a humid region increases sweat and the accumulation of moisture, contributing to the aggravation of the skin. Similarly, poor hygiene can exacerbate friction as this brings dirt and other particles to build up, increasing the potential and severity of an inflammatory response. Infants' tendency to drool onto their skin folds also puts them at greater risk for infection and intertrigo.

== Diagnosis ==
Streptococcal intertrigo is diagnosed by a medical professional after performing a detailed physical examination and taking an overnight culture of the affected areas. A second sample is tested with a rapid antigen detection test for Group A streptococcus. Upon physical examination, streptococcal intertrigo commonly presents with a marked area of redness of the skin, a distinct, foul smell, and a lack of satellite lesions. The presence of satellite lesions, or lesions smaller and further away from the main affected region, may point to a differential diagnosis of candidal intertrigo, which is a more common cause of these characteristics. Streptococcal intertrigo is frequently underdiagnosed and should be considered as a causative agent when standard therapy for candidal intertrigo fails.

Other differential diagnoses which may present similarly include seborrheic dermatitis, atopic dermatitis, irritant contact dermatitis, allergic contact dermatitis, mixed bacterial intertrigo, scabies, erythrasma, and inverse psoriasis.

== Prevention ==
Given the main etiology of streptococcal intertrigo is the warm and moist skin surface, in order to prevent future infection and repeat incident of this kind, it is best to keep the affected area and other skin folds clean and dry of moisture. It is also helpful to expose such areas to air and limit skin-on-skin friction as much as possible. In order to decrease friction as a predisposing factor, weight loss for individuals with obesity or reduction mammoplasty for large breasts is encouraged and recommended. To decrease the chance of worsening symptoms, a drying agent, such as baby powder, can be applied. Application of other barrier agents, such as zinc oxide or petrolatum, aids in the reduction of skin deterioration and alleviates itching and pain.

== Treatment ==
The most common treatment options of intertrigo complicated with secondary bacterial infection such as group A beta-hemolytic streptococcus are topical mupirocin (bactroban), erythromycin, low potency topical steroids like hydrocortisone 1% cream, and oral antibiotics (such as oral penicillin, cephalexin, ceftriaxon, cefazolin, and clindamycin). These broad-spectrum antibiotics are ideal in targeting bacterial agents due to the large number of microbiota on the human skin. Additionally, the low potency steroids aid in the reduction of the reaction, reducing discomfort to the patient. Drying agents, such as aluminum sulfate and talcum powder, may be used alongside other treatments to help the healing process to go faster. Although, if these agents are to be used, it is better to space them few hours apart. A hair drier could also be utilized on the affected area as intertrigo responds well to the removal of moisture. Age is an important factor to consider when dosing since intertrigo is prevalent amongst young children. Proper identification of etiology is required in order to treat optimally.

== Case studies ==
=== 3-month old infant ===
A 3-month old infant presented with streptococcal intertrigo after experiencing a rash in their groin area for 3 days. A bright, distinct red coloration was evident in the infant's skin folds, which were also moist and wrinkly. A bacterial sample was collected and tested on with antibiotics. The infant was initially treated with oral flucloxacillin which proved to be effective in clearing the bacteria. From the culture, the bacteria was classified as a group A beta-hemolytic streptococci.

=== 5-month old male ===
A 5-month old infant with a history of eczema presented with a dark red rash on their ear, neck and lower limbs. They were initially diagnosed with intertrigo due excessive drooling and were prescribed a course of antifungal topical powder. The infant returned to the pediatrician a week later because the rash had gotten worse and their eczema was greatly exacerbated. A skin culture was done as it was suspected that the rash was due to a bacterial infection instead. Streptococcus pyogenes was the predominant growth found in the culture. The patient was prescribed a cephalexin suspension and a dexamethasone suspension, which resolved the inflammation after 3 weeks.

=== 2-year old female ===
A 2-year old female presented with a well-demarcated red, smooth plaque, foul smell, and no satellite lesions on the left armpit and neck for 2 weeks. They were initially treated for candidal intertrigo without improvement in their condition. The affected areas were swabbed, and the culture grew group A beta-hemolytic Streptococcus pyogenes that was sensitive to penicillin. They were then diagnosed with streptococcal intertrigo and prescribed amoxicillin plus clavulanic acid antibiotics for 7 days along with topical application of fusidic acid. The intertrigo completely resolved with this regimen.

== Epidemiology ==
Cases of intertrigo originating from streptococcal bacteria are uncommon and underreported. Because intertrigo can come from many different sources, it is difficult to reliably track its etiology.

== See also ==
- Skin lesion
- Intertrigo
