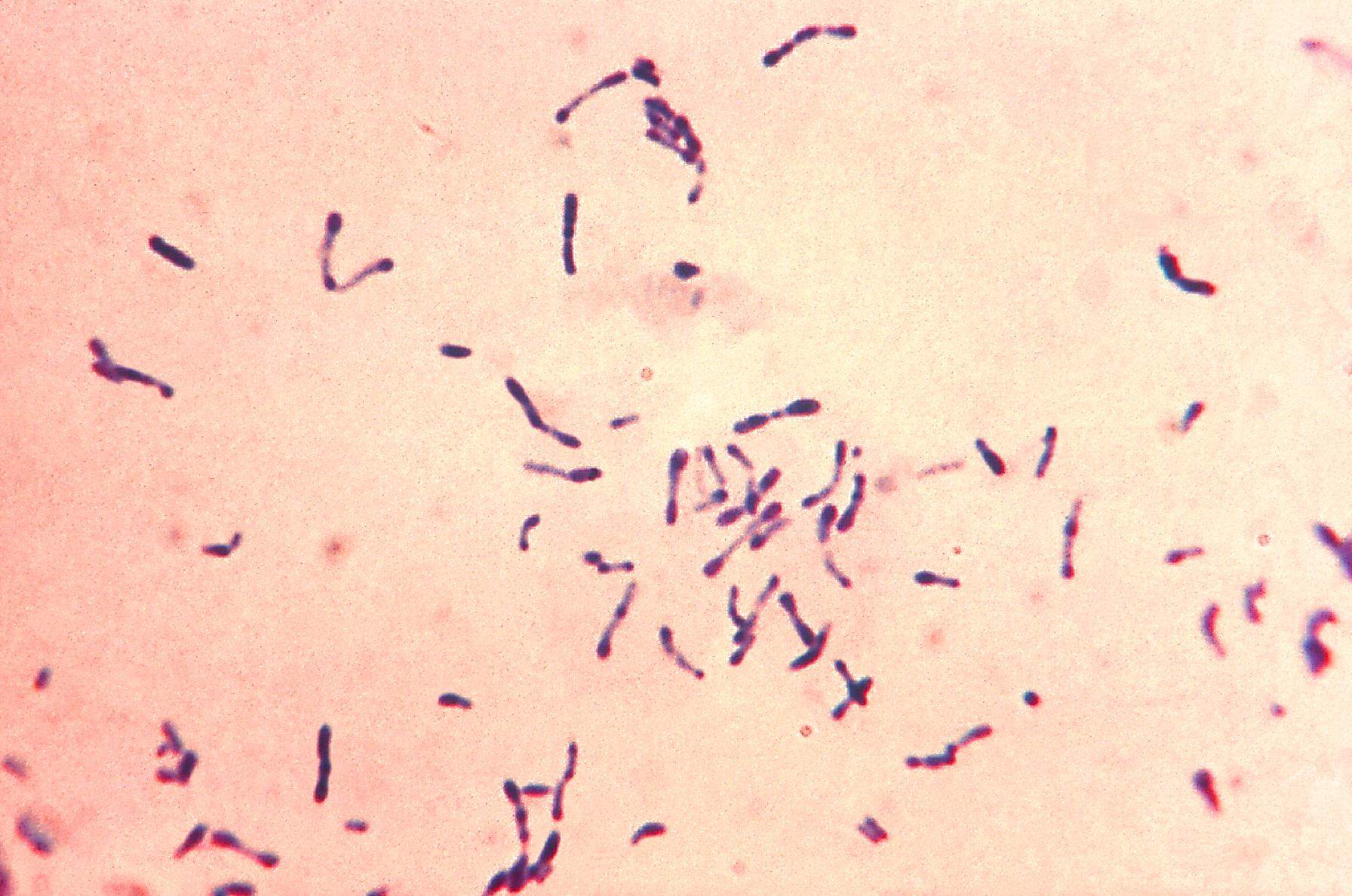

Scientific classification
- Domain: Bacteria
- Kingdom: Bacillati
- Phylum: Actinomycetota
- Class: Actinomycetes
- Order: Mycobacteriales
- Family: Corynebacteriaceae
- Genus: Corynebacterium
- Species: C. diphtheriae

Binomial name
- Corynebacterium diphtheriae (Kruse 1886) Lehmann and Neumann 1896 (Approved Lists 1980)

= Corynebacterium diphtheriae =

Species of prokaryote

Corynebacterium diphtheriae (Note: Pronunciation: /kɔːˈraɪnəbæktɪəriəm dɪfˈθɪərii, -rɪnə-/.) is a Gram-positive pathogenic bacterium that causes diphtheria. It is also known as the Klebs–Löffler bacillus because it was discovered in 1884 by German bacteriologists Edwin Klebs (1834–1913) and Friedrich Löffler (1852–1915). While nontoxigenic C. diphtheriae may rarely produce systemic disease by invading tissues, virulence is enhanced when the bacteria are infected by a bacteriophage carrying a gene which gives rise to a toxin. This toxin causes the disease.

Diphtheria is caused by the adhesion and infiltration of the bacteria into the mucosal layers of the body, primarily affecting the respiratory tract and causing the subsequent release of an exotoxin. The toxin has a localized effect on skin lesions, as well as a metastatic, proteolytic effects on other organ systems in severe infections. Originally a major cause of childhood mortality, respiratory diphtheria has become rare in the United States by the vigorous administration of diphtheria vaccines starting in 1914.

The incidence of diphtheria has decreased since the development of a toxoid vaccine in 1923. Although diphtheria outbreaks continue to occur, this is often in developing countries where the majority of the population is not vaccinated. Cutaneous diphtheria, skin lesions infected by toxigenic C. diphtheriae, are prevalent in tropical climates and may contribute to diphtheria outbreaks.

== Classification ==
Four subspecies are recognized: C. d. mitis, C. d. intermedius, C. d. gravis, and C. d. belfanti. The four subspecies differ slightly in their colonial morphology and biochemical properties, such as the ability to metabolize certain nutrients. All may be either toxigenic (and therefore cause diphtheria) or not toxigenic.

Strain subtyping involves comparing species of bacteria and categorizing them into subspecies. Strain subtyping also helps with identifying the origin of a certain bacteria's outbreak. However, when it comes to the subtyping of C. diphtheriae, there is not a lot of useful or accurate classification due to the lack of publicly available resources to identify strains and therefore find the origin of outbreaks.

Corynebacterium diphtheriae is part of the C. diphtheriae species complex, which also includes C. belfantii, C. pseudotuberculosis, C. rouxii, C. silvaticum, C. ulcerans and C. ramonii.

== Toxin ==
C. diphtheriae produces the diphtheria toxin which alters protein function in the host by inactivating the elongation factor EF-2. This causes pharyngitis and 'pseudomembrane' in the throat. The strains that are toxigenic are ones which have been infected with a bacteriophage.

The diphtheria toxin gene is encoded by a corynephage found in toxigenic strains, integrated into the bacterial chromosome in the lysogenic phase of the bacteriophage.

The diphtheria toxin repressor is mainly controlled by iron. It serves as the essential cofactor for the activation of target DNA binding. A low concentration of iron is required in the medium for toxin production. At high iron concentrations, iron molecules bind to an aporepressor on the beta bacteriophage, which carries the Tox gene. When bound to iron, the aporepressor shuts down toxin production. Elek's test for toxigenicity is used to determine whether the organism is able to produce the diphtheria toxin.

Diphtheria toxin can also be produced by certain strains of Corynebacterium ulcerans and Corynebacterium pseudotuberculosis, which are zoonotic pathogens, as well as other phage-infected members of the C. diphtheriae complex.

== Identification ==
To identify C. diphtheriae, a Gram stain is performed to show Gram-positive, highly pleomorphic organisms often looking like Chinese letters. Stains such as Albert's stain and Ponder's stain are used to demonstrate the metachromatic granules formed in the polar regions. The granules are called polar granules, or volutin granules, known under the eponymous name Babes-Ernst granules after their inventors Paul Ernst and Victor Babes. An enrichment medium, such as Löffler's medium, preferentially grows C. diphtheriae. After that, a differential plate known as tellurite agar, allows all Corynebacteria (including C. diphtheriae) to reduce tellurite to metallic tellurium. The tellurite reduction is colourimetrically indicated by brown colonies for most Corynebacterium species or by a black halo around the C. diphtheriae colonies. The organism produces catalase but not urease, which differentiates it from Corynebacterium ulcerans. C. diphtheriae does not produce pyrazinamidase which differentiates from Corynebacterium striatum and Corynebacterium jeikeium.

== Pathogenicity ==
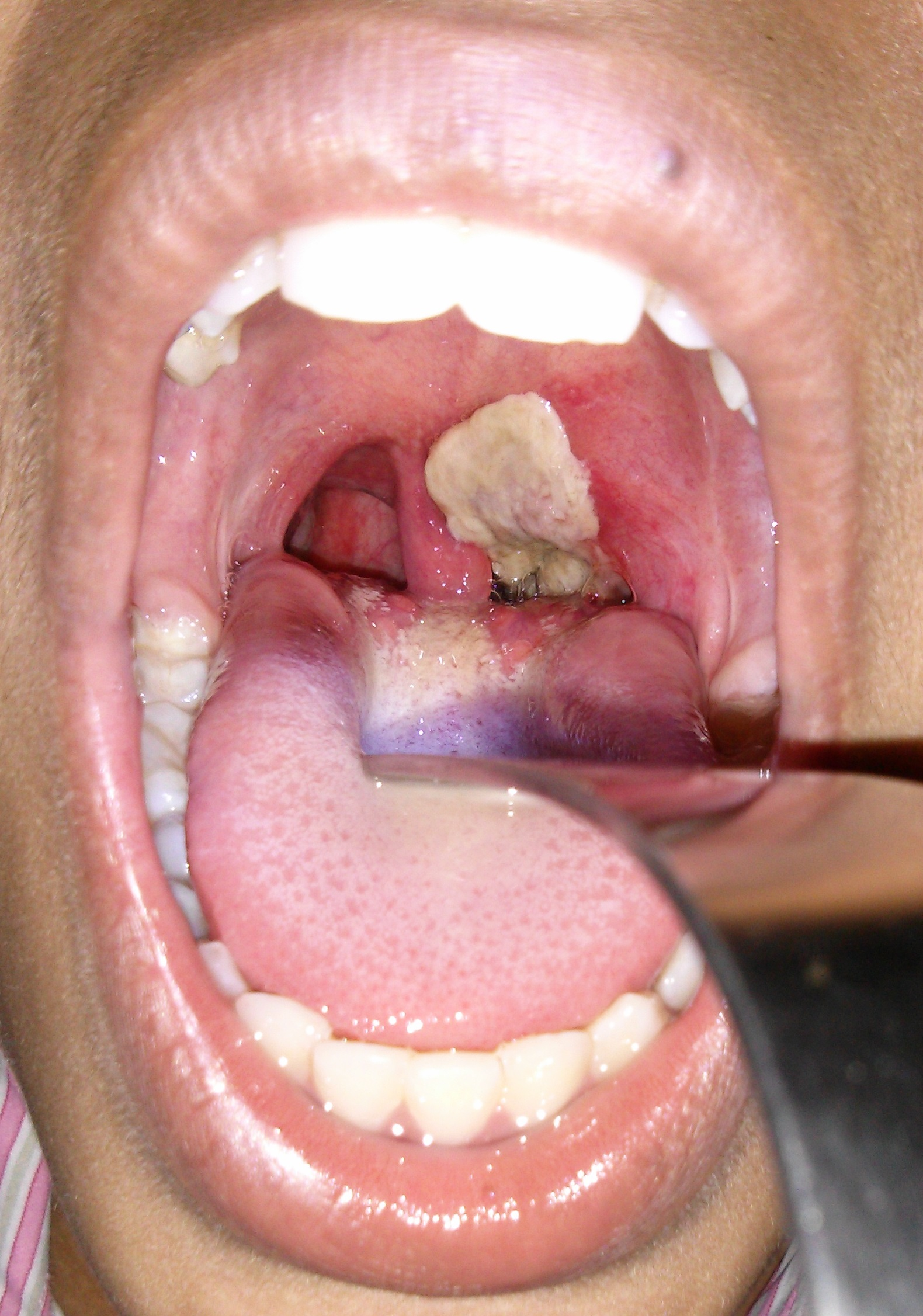
An adherent, dense, grey pseudomembrane covering the tonsils is classically seen in diphtheria.

Corynebacterium diphtheriae is the bacterium that causes the disease called diphtheria. Bacteriophages introduce a gene into the bacterial cells that makes a strain toxigenic. The strains that are not infected with these viruses are harmless. C. diphtheriae is a rod-shaped, Gram-positive, non spore-forming, and nonmotile bacterium. C. diphtheriae has shown to exclusively infect humans. It is believed that humans may be the reservoir for this pathogen. However, there have been extremely rare cases in which C. diphtheriae has been found in animals. These infections were only toxigenic in two dogs and two horses.

The disease occurs primarily in tropical regions and developing countries. Immunocompromised individuals, poorly immunized adults, and unvaccinated children are at the greatest risk of contracting diphtheria. Mode of transmission is person-to-person contact via respiratory droplets (i.e., coughing or sneezing). Less commonly, it could also be passed by touching open sores or contaminated surfaces. During the typical course of disease, the body region most commonly affected is the upper respiratory system. A thick, grey coating accumulates in the nasopharyngeal region, making breathing and swallowing more difficult. The disease remains contagious for at least two weeks following the disappearance of symptoms but has been known to last for up to a month.

The most common routes of entry for C. diphtheriae are the nose, tonsils, and throat. Individuals suffering from the disease may experience sore throat, weakness, fever, and swollen glands. This could cause even more dangerous symptoms such as shortness of breath. If left untreated, diphtheria toxin may enter the bloodstream, causing damage to the kidneys, nerves, and heart. Extremely rare complications include suffocation and partial paralysis. A vaccine, DTaP, effectively prevents the disease and is mandatory in the United States for participation in public education and some professions (exceptions apply).

The first step of C. diphtheriae infection involves the toxigenic bacteria colonizing a mucosal layer. In young children, this typically occurs in the upper respiratory tract mucosa. In adults, the infection is limited mostly to the tonsillar region. Some unusual sites of infection include the heart, larynx, trachea, bronchi, and anterior areas of the mouth including the buccal mucosa, the lips, tongue, and the hard and soft palate. The bacteria have several virulence factors to help them localize on areas of the respiratory tract, many of which are yet to be fully understood as diphtheria does not affect many model hosts such as mice. One common virulence factor that has been studied in vitro is DIP0733, a multi-functional protein that has been shown to have a role in bacterial adhesion to host cells and fibrogen-binding qualities. In experiments with mutant strains of the C. diphtheriae, adhesion and epithelial infiltration decreased significantly. The ability to bind to extracellular matrices aids the bacteria in avoiding detection by the body's immune system.

The diphtheritic lesion is often covered by a pseudomembrane composed of fibrin, bacterial cells, and inflammatory cells. Diphtheria toxin can be proteolytically cleaved into two fragments: an N-terminal fragment A (catalytic domain), and fragment B (transmembrane and receptor binding domain). Fragment A catalyzes the NAD+ -dependent ADP-ribosylation of elongation factor 2, thereby inhibiting protein synthesis in eukaryotic cells. Fragment B binds to the cell surface receptor and facilitates the delivery of fragment A to the cytosol.

Once the bacteria have localized in one area, they start multiplying and create the inflammatory pseudomembrane. Individuals with faucial diphtheria typically have the pseudomembrane grow over the tonsil and accessory structures, uvula, soft palate, and possibly the nasopharyngeal area. In upper respiratory tract diphtheria, the pseudomembrane can grow on the pharynx, larynx, trachea, and bronchi/bronchioles. The pseudomembrane starts off white in colour and then later becomes dirty-grey and tough due to the necrotic epithelium.

Pseudomembrane formation on the trachea or bronchi will decrease the efficiency of airflow. Over time, the diffusion rate in the alveoli decreases due to the lower airflow and decreases the partial pressure of oxygen in the systemic circulation, which can cause cyanosis and suffocation.

== Transmission ==
Mode of transmission is person-to-person contact via respiratory droplets (i.e., coughing or sneezing), and less commonly, by touching open sores or contaminated surfaces.

== Vaccine ==
A vaccine, DTaP, effectively prevents the disease and is mandatory in the United States for participation in public education and some professions (exceptions apply).

The invention of the toxoid vaccine, which provides protection against Corynebacterium diphtheriae, caused a dramatic shift in the bacterium's rate of infection in the United States. Even though the vaccine was first made in the early 1800s, it did not become widely available until the early 1910s. According to the National Health and Nutrition Examination Survey (NHANES), "80 per cent of persons age 12 to 19 years were immune to diphtheria" due to the wide use of the vaccine in the United States.

== Diagnosis ==
Diagnosis of respiratory C. diphtheriae is made based on presentation clinically, whereas non-respiratory diphtheria may not be clinically suspected therefore laboratory testing is more reliant. Culturing is the most accurate kind of testing that will confirm or deny the prevalence of diphtheria toxins. The testing is done by swabbing the possibly infected area, as well as any lesions and sores.

== Treatment and prevention ==
When a toxigenic strain of Corynebacterium diphtheriae infects the human body, it releases harmful toxins, especially to the throat. Antitoxins are used to prevent further harm. Antibiotics are also used to fight the infection. Typical antibiotics that are used against diphtheria involve penicillin or erythromycin. People infected with diphtheria must quarantine for at least 48 hours after being prescribed antibiotics. To confirm that the person is no longer contagious, tests are performed ensure that the bacteria have been cleared. People are then vaccinated to prevent further transmission of the disease.

The wide use of the diphtheria vaccine dramatically decreased the rate of infection and allows for primary prevention of the disease. Most people receive a 3-in-1 vaccine that consists of protection against diphtheria, tetanus and pertussis, which is commonly known as the DTaP or Tdap vaccine. DTaP vaccine is for children while the Tdap vaccine is known for adolescents and adults.

In the United States, the DTaP vaccine to parents of infants which typically involves a series of five shots is recommended. These vaccines are injected through the arm or thigh and are administered when the infant is 2 months, 4 months, 6 months, 15–18 months and then 4–6 years old.

Possible side events that are associated with the diphtheria vaccine include "mild fever, fussiness, drowsiness or tenderness at the injection site". Although it is rare, the DTaP vaccine may cause an allergic reaction that causes hives or a rash to breakout within minutes of administering the vaccine.

== Genetics ==
The genome of C. diphtheriae consists of a single circular chromosome of 2.5 Mbp, with no plasmids. Its genome shows an extreme compositional bias, being noticeably higher in G+C near the origin than at the terminus.

The Corynebacterium diphtheriae genome is a single circular chromosome that has no plasmids. These chromosomes have a high G+C content which is what contributes to their high genetic diversity. The high content of guanine and cytosine is not constant across the entire genome of the bacteria. There is a terminus of replication around the ~740kb region that causes a decrease in the G+C content. In other bacteria, it is often seen that the G+C content gets smaller near the terminus, but C. diphtheriae is a considerably strong genome that has this occurrence. Chromosomal replication is one of the ways this happens within this genome.

== See also ==
- Cutaneous diphtheria
- Diphtheria vaccine
