= Trichomycosis axillaris =

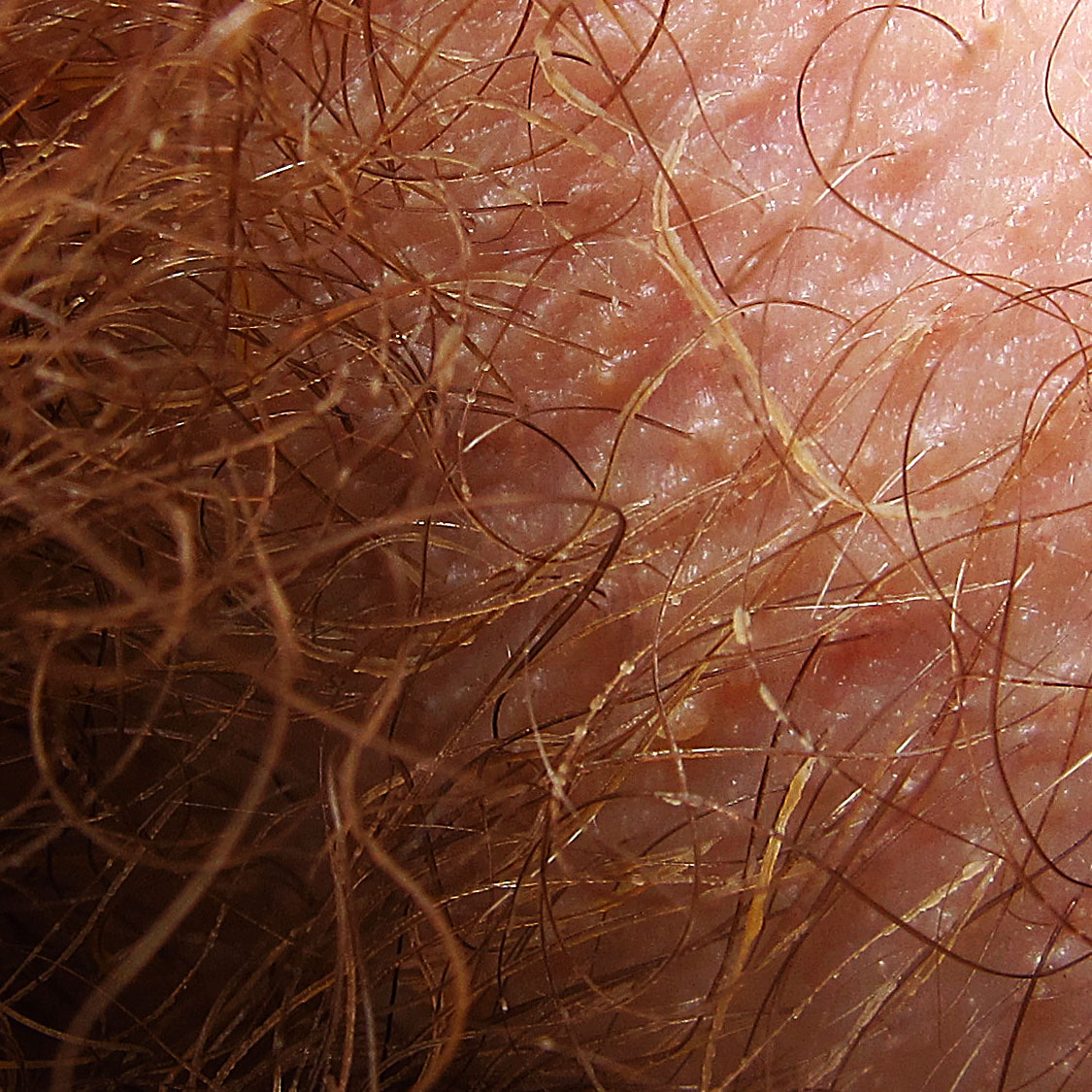
- An armpit with variably encrusted hairs
- Specialty: Dermatology

Trichomycosis axillaris is a superficial bacterial colonization of the hair shafts in sweat gland–bearing areas, such as the armpits and the groin. It is a trivial disease of worldwide occurrence that is believed to be caused by the genus Corynebacteria.

Trichomycosis was first described in 1869 by Francis Valentine Paxton in his article On a disease condition of the hairs of the axilla, probably of parasitic origin. The condition has been called trichomycosis axillaris in literature extensively, but because it is a bacterial infection and not a parasitic or fungal infection, its official name is trichobacteriosis.

== Presentation ==
It is characterized by the presence of concretions along the hair shafts, clinically observed as yellow, and rarely as red or black nodules. These concretions derive from bacterial colonization along the hair shaft containing dried apocrine sweat with a cementing substance generated by the bacteria.

== Cause ==
It is caused by several species of Corynebacterium.

Obesity, hyperhidrosis, poor local hygiene, and warm, moist environments are common predisposing factors.

== Diagnosis ==
The infection is diagnosed by close examination of the hair shafts where brown to yellow material called concretions are seen. There is usually an associated rancid odour. A microscopic examination can confirm the diagnosis, but this is rarely needed.

Some patients with excessive sweating present the so-called corynebacterial triad, that is, the simultaneous presence of trichomycosis axillaris, erythrasma, and pitted keratolysis.

== Treatment ==
No specific therapeutic studies on trichomycosis are available.

Many authors consider that the most effective treatment consist in shaving of the affected area for a period of 2–3 weeks. The use of a concomitant treatment, such as sulfur soaps or benzoyl peroxide is also recommended. Rubbing whilst washing may help to disrupt the biofilm, hence increasing the accessibility of antiseptics to the bacteria.

Patients who shave the affected area only once will generally experience a recurrence of the infection, since, the bacteria begin to develop the concretions once again as the hair grows back.

Corynebacterium infections are related to excessive sweating; for this reason, deodorants containing an aluminum chloride solution may be used for treatment and prevention.

Maintaining good local hygiene is recommended.

== See also ==
- List of cutaneous conditions
