= Group JK corynebacterium sepsis =

- Specialty: Dermatology

Group JK corynebacterium sepsis is a form of sepsis which occurs when the bacterium Corynebacterium jeikeium colonizes the skin of healthy individuals and gains access to a person's blood stream.

== See also ==
- Skin lesion
