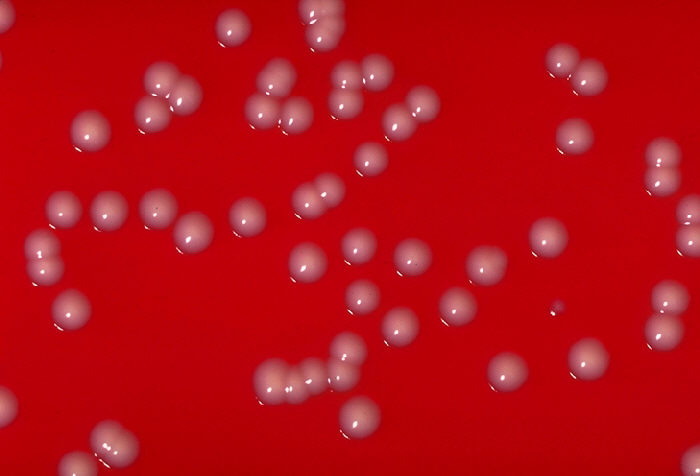

Scientific classification
- Domain: Bacteria
- Kingdom: Bacillati
- Phylum: Actinomycetota
- Class: Actinomycetes
- Order: Mycobacteriales
- Family: Corynebacteriaceae
- Genus: Corynebacterium
- Species: C. ulcerans

Binomial name
- Corynebacterium ulcerans (ex Gilbert and Stewart 1927) Riegel et al. 1995

= Corynebacterium ulcerans =

Species of prokaryote

Corynebacterium ulcerans is a rod-shaped, aerobic, and Gram-positive bacterium. Most Corynebacterium species are harmless, but some cause serious illness in humans, especially in immunocompromised humans. C. ulcerans has been known to cause diphtheria and diphtheria-like infections in patients. Previously thought to simply be contaminants recovered from diphtheria patients, “coryneform” or “diphtheroids” are now believed to be the cause of such infections.

== Disease ==
Increasingly over the past few decades, C. ulcerans has been recognized as an emerging pathogen in over six countries across the globe including the United States, the United Kingdom, and Japan. Corynebacterium diphtheriae is the causative agent of classical diphtheria, and C. ulcerans has been found to carry the same gene that codes for the diphtheria toxin. After swabbing lesions on a 53-year-old woman in Germany who experienced swelling of her pharynx and who developed a whitish pseudomembrane, doctors were able to grow C. ulcerans. This made it the first documented case of classical diphtheria caused by C. ulcerans in Germany.

C. ulcerans can also cause zoonotic infections. In 2003, A 47-year-old woman in Le Kremlin-Bicêtre, France was admitted to the intensive care unit for labored breathing. It was found that as a result of a kidney graft received the previous year, the patient was immunocompromised and vulnerable to C. ulcerans, which was found growing from a swab of her throat. Testing determined the patient likely contracted C. ulcerans from chronic labial ulcerations in her dog.

In addition to classical diphtheria, C. ulcerans can also cause skin infections that resemble classical cutaneous diphtheria as a result of production of the diphtheria toxin. By contracting this skin infection, patients become more vulnerable to contracting infections from other bacteria that exist naturally in the patient's environment that can cause life-threatening diseases.

== Treatment ==
Patients who contract diphtheria and diphtheria-like symptoms as a result of C. ulcerans require treatment with diphtheria antitoxin and antibiotics. Surgery and other more extreme measures must be taken if not treated immediately.

== Veterinary medicine ==
C. ulcerans can also cause abscesses in wild Eurasian beavers.
