= Elek's test =

Test in microbiology for diphtheria toxin production

Elek's test or the Elek plate test is an in vitro test of virulence performed on specimens of Corynebacterium diphtheriae, the bacteria that causes diphtheria. It is used to test for toxigenicity of C. diphtheriae strains.

The test uses immunodiffusion. A strip of filter paper impregnated with diphtheria antitoxin is buried just beneath the surface of a special agar plate before the agar hardens. Strains to be tested are streaked with known positive and known negative toxigenic strains on the agar's surface in a line across the plate, and at a right angle to the antitoxin paper strip. After incubation for 24 hours at 37 degrees Celsius, plates are examined with transmitted light for the presence of fine precipitin lines at a 45-degree angle to the streaks. The presence of precipitin lines indicates that the strain produced toxin that reacted with the antitoxin.

The test was characterized in 1949 by Hungarian-born British microbiologist Stephen Dyonis Elek (1914–1992). It provided an easier way to test the toxigenicity of C. diphtheriae specimens compared with previous tests. It also allowed an in vitro test to replace a clinical test on laboratory animals, helping with the "reduce" component of the three R's. Diphtheria was a major public health scourge, killing entire families with acute airborne pulmonary disease, before diphtheria vaccine brought it under control. At the time Elek developed this test, control of the disease was not yet secured in all regions of the world. Today its control is threatened by vaccine hesitancy.
