= Corynebacterium alimapuense =

Scientific classification
- Domain: Bacteria
- Kingdom: Bacillati
- Phylum: Actinomycetota
- Class: Actinomycetia
- Order: Mycobacteriales
- Family: Corynebacteriaceae
- Genus: Corynebacterium
- Species: C. alimapuense

Binomial name
- Corynebacterium alimapuense Claverias et al. 2019

Species of prokaryote

Corynebacterium alimapuense is a species of bacteria in the genus Corynebacterium that was described as a novel species in 2019. It is a Gram positive, non-motile, aerobic bacterium that does not form spores. Its type strain (VA37-3^{T} = CCUG 69366^{T} = NCIMB 15118^{T}) was isolated from marine sediment from Valparaíso Bay, Chile. The draft genome sequence of the type strain is deposited in DNA Data Bank of Japan, European Nucleotide Archive and GenBank under the accession number PTJO00000000.
