= Corynebacterium macginleyi =

Scientific classification
- Domain: Bacteria
- Kingdom: Bacillati
- Phylum: Actinomycetota
- Class: Actinomycetes
- Order: Mycobacteriales
- Family: Corynebacteriaceae
- Genus: Corynebacterium
- Species: C. macginleyi

Binomial name
- Corynebacterium macginleyi Riegel et al. 1995

Species of bacterium

Corynebacterium macginleyi is a species of bacteria with type strain JCL-2 (CIP 104099). It is considered pathogenic.
