= Corynebacterium matruchotii =

Scientific classification
- Domain: Bacteria
- Kingdom: Bacillati
- Phylum: Actinomycetota
- Class: Actinomycetes
- Order: Mycobacteriales
- Family: Corynebacteriaceae
- Genus: Corynebacterium
- Species: C. matruchotii

Binomial name
- Corynebacterium matruchotii (Mendel 1919) Collins 1983

Species of bacterium

Corynebacterium matruchotii is a species of bacteria in the genus Corynebacterium. Corynebacteria occur within the normal flora of the human body.

Corynebacterium matruchotii are Gram positive bacilli with long filaments and short, thick terminal ends. C. matruchotii is a bacterium of significance within the oral cavity and comprises the central filament of "corn-cob formations" (formations in which Streptococcus sanguinis bacteria bind to and surround C. matruchotii to create a corn-cob appearance). C. matruchotii can be isolated from dental plaque, although it is not known to be associated with the etiology of dental diseases.
