= Pyoderma =

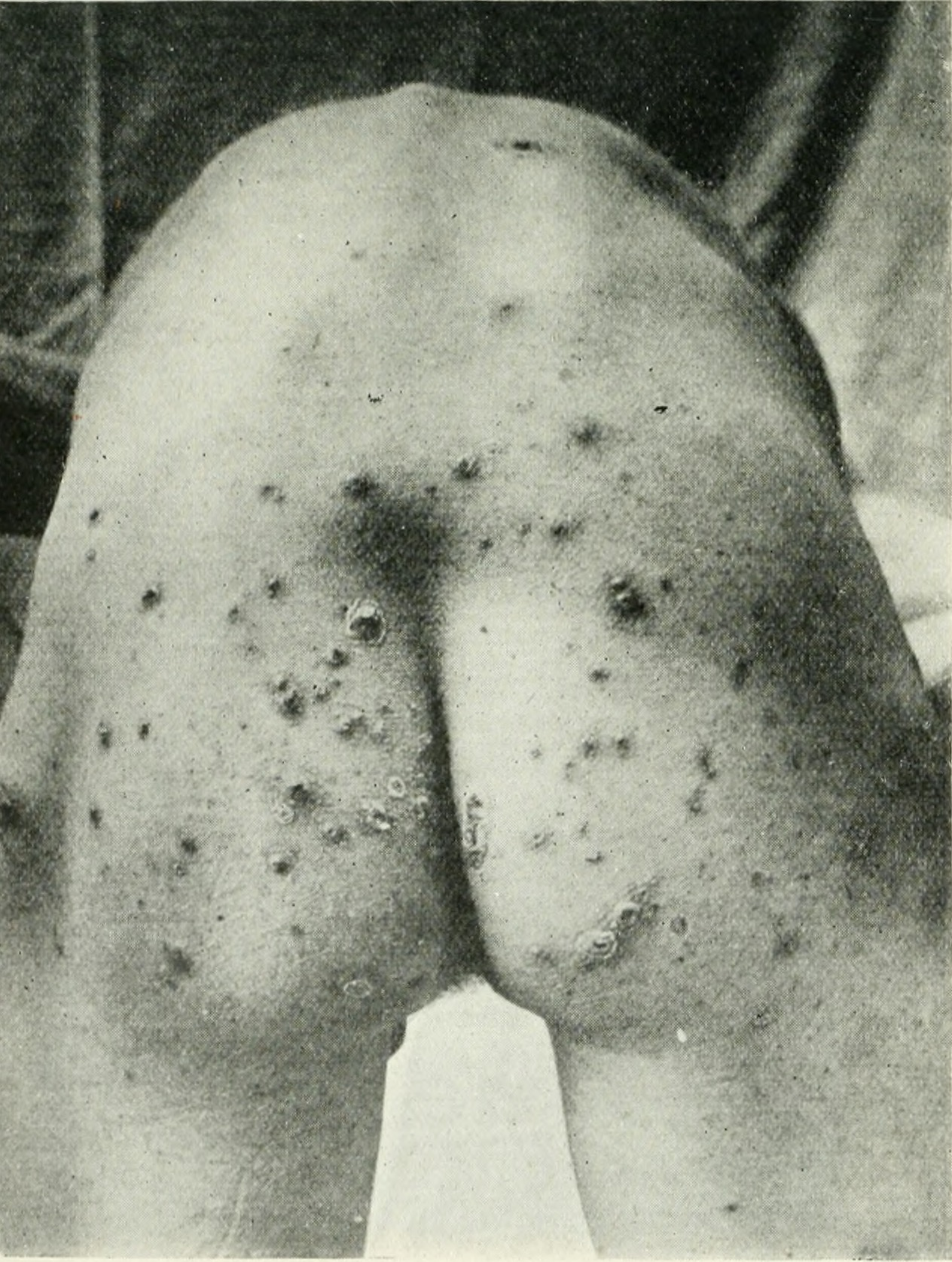
- Pyodermia of parasitic origin
- Specialty: Dermatology

Pyoderma means any skin disease that is pyogenic (has pus). These include superficial bacterial infections such as impetigo, impetigo contagiosa, ecthyma, folliculitis, Bockhart's impetigo, furuncle, carbuncle, tropical ulcer, etc. Autoimmune conditions include pyoderma gangrenosum. Pyoderma affects more than 111 million children worldwide, making it one of the three most common skin disorders in children along with scabies and tinea.

== See also ==
- List of cutaneous conditions
