= Corynebacterium efficiens =

Scientific classification
- Domain: Bacteria
- Kingdom: Bacillati
- Phylum: Actinomycetota
- Class: Actinomycetes
- Order: Mycobacteriales
- Family: Corynebacteriaceae
- Genus: Corynebacterium
- Species: C. efficiens

Binomial name
- Corynebacterium efficiens Fudou et al. 2002

Species of prokaryote

Corynebacterium efficiens is a thermotolerant, glutamic acid-producing (from dextrin) species of bacteria from soil and vegetables. Its type strain is YS-314^{T} (= AJ 12310^{T} = JCM 11189^{T} = DSM 44549^{T}).
