= Corynebacterium otitidis =

Scientific classification
- Domain: Bacteria
- Kingdom: Bacillati
- Phylum: Actinomycetota
- Class: Actinomycetes
- Order: Mycobacteriales
- Family: Corynebacteriaceae
- Genus: Corynebacterium
- Species: C. otitidis

Binomial name
- Corynebacterium otitidis (Funke et al. 1994) Baek et al. 2018

Type strain
- 234; 234/92; ATCC 51513; CCUG 32254; CIP 104075; DSM 8821; JCM 12146; LMG 19071

Synonyms
- Turicella otitidis Funke et al. 1994

Species of bacterium

Corynebacterium otitidis is a coryneform Gram-positive bacterium first isolated from patients with otitis media.
