= Cutaneous diphtheria infection =

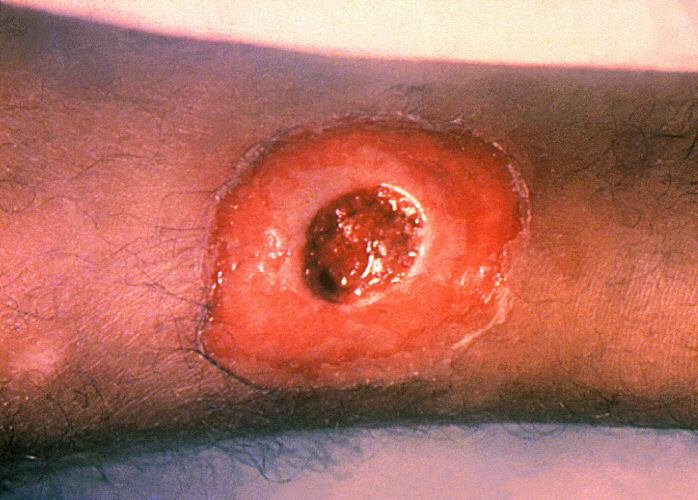
- A diphtheria skin lesion on the leg
- Specialty: Infectious diseases

Cutaneous diphtheria is an infection of the skin by Corynebacterium diphtheriae. It is also known as "desert sore". The infection can provoke a chronic ulcer that requires treatment with antibiotics.

The pathogen is common in tropical country and normally causes respiratory infections in those regions, but cases of cutaneous diphtheria sometimes appear in underprivileged populations in developed countries.

== See also ==
- Diphtheria
- Skin lesion
