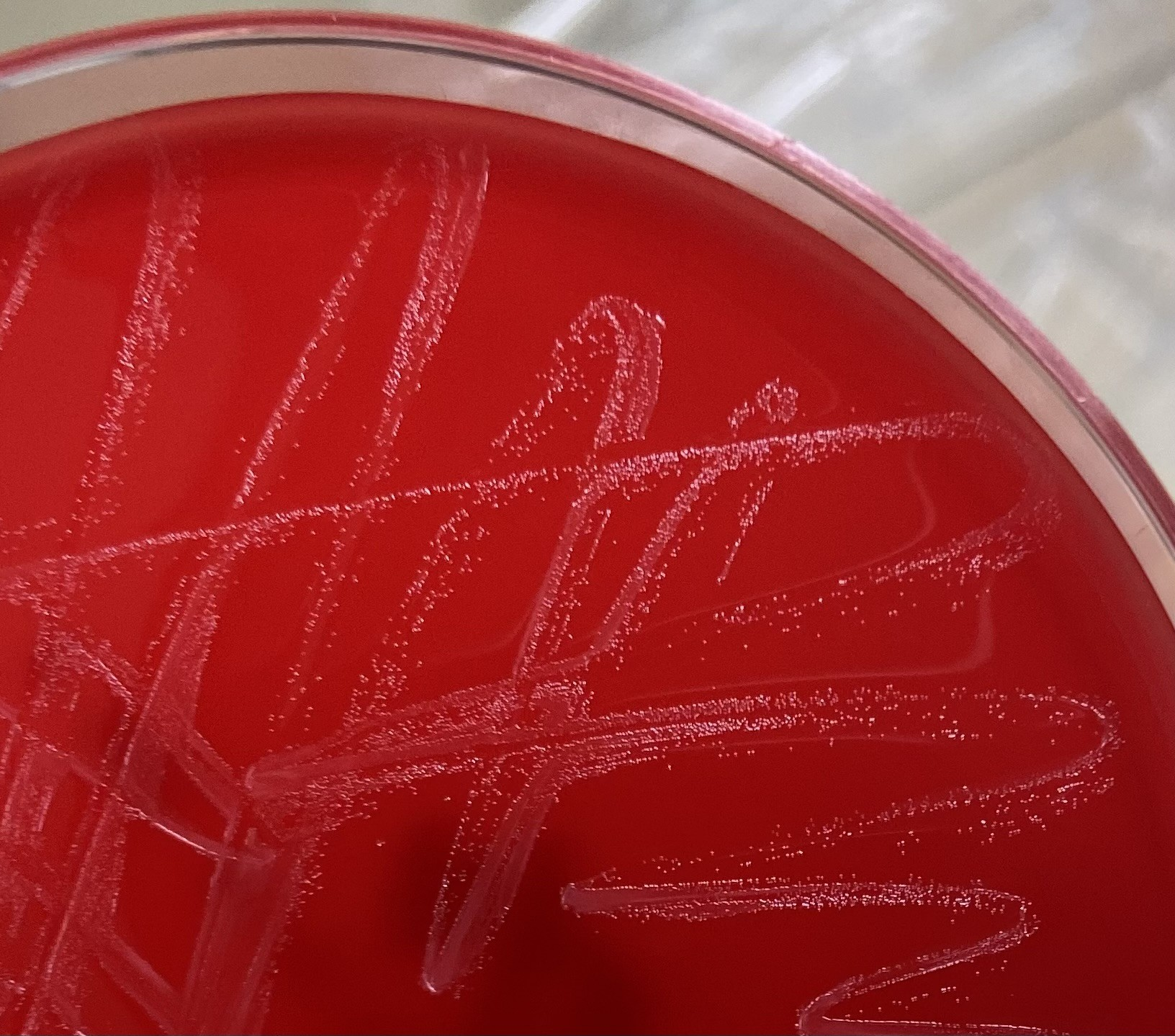

Scientific classification
- Domain: Bacteria
- Kingdom: Bacillati
- Phylum: Actinomycetota
- Class: Actinomycetes
- Order: Mycobacteriales
- Family: Corynebacteriaceae
- Genus: Corynebacterium
- Species: C. urealyticum

Binomial name
- Corynebacterium urealyticum Pitcher et al. 1992

= Corynebacterium urealyticum =

Species of prokaryote

Corynebacterium urealyticum is a of gram-positive bacteria from the genus Corynebacterium. It is an opportunistic pathogen linked to urinary tract infections.

== Microbiology ==
Corynebacterium urealyticum is a slow growing, lipophilic, asaccharolytic Gram-positive rod. Similar to other Corynebacterium, it is catalase positive and non-motile. C. urealyticum, as the name implies, secretes the enzyme urease which can be strong enough to make urine alkaline.

== Pathogenesis ==
Corynebacterium urealyticum is known to colonize humans, especially those receiving broad-spectrum antibiotics. The species can adhere to uroepithelial cells. C. urealyticum utilizes a pilus to covalently attach itself to host tissues.

== Clinical significance ==
Corynebacterium urealyticum is known to cause urinary tract infections (UTIs). C. urealyticum infection can lead to the formation of struvite calculi or renal stones. Risk factors associated with this bacterium include immunosuppression, underlying genitourinary disorders, and antibiotic therapy. There are other urease-producing corynebacteria that are associated with urinary tract infections, but C. urealyticum is the most common.

The most common form of UTI caused by C. urealyticum is acute cystitis.

== Antibiotics ==
Corynebacterium urealyticum is historically susceptible to fluoroquinolones; however, resistance to this class of antibiotic is increasing. A 12 year retrospective study performed in 2020 reported >90% of C. urealyticum isolates to be multi-drug resistant. Notably, all the isolates used in the study were susceptible to vancomycin. Rifampicin and linezolid also showed lower resistance.
