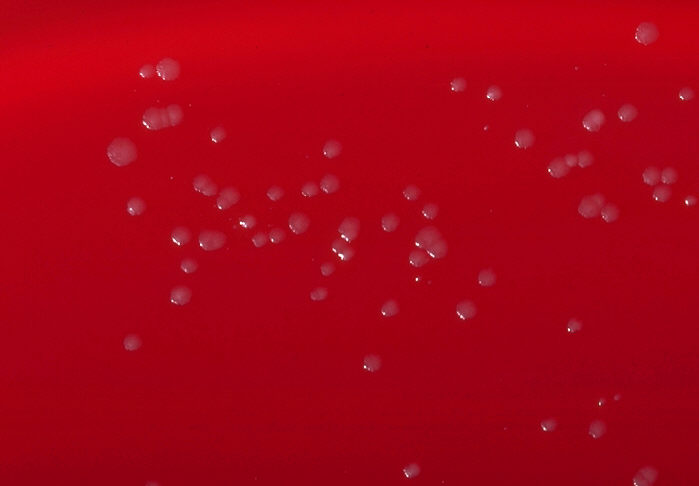
- Blood agar plate culture of Corynebacterium renale

Scientific classification
- Domain: Bacteria
- Kingdom: Bacillati
- Phylum: Actinomycetota
- Class: Actinomycetes
- Order: Mycobacteriales
- Family: Corynebacteriaceae
- Genus: Corynebacterium
- Species: C. renale

Binomial name
- Corynebacterium renale (Migula 1900) Ernst 1906 (Approved Lists 1980)

= Corynebacterium renale =

Species of bacterium

Corynebacterium renale is a pathogenic bacterium that causes cystitis and pyelonephritis in cattle.

C. renale is a facultatively anaerobic Gram-positive organism, characterized by nonencapsulated, nonsporulated, immobile, straight or curved rods with a length of 1 to 8 μm and width of 0.3 to 0.8 μm, which forms ramified aggregations in culture (looking like "Chinese characters").

The bacterium is sensitive to the majority of antibiotics, such as penicillins, ampicillin, cephalosporins, quinolones, chloramphenicol, tetracyclines, cefuroxime, and trimethoprim.

Due to similarities in diagnostic testing procedures Corynebacterium cystiditis may be misdiagnosed as Corynebacterium renale in beef cattle.
