= Corynebacterium glutamicum =

- C. glutamicum under scanning electron microscopy.

Scientific classification
- Domain: Bacteria
- Kingdom: Bacillati
- Phylum: Actinomycetota
- Class: Actinomycetes
- Order: Mycobacteriales
- Family: Corynebacteriaceae
- Genus: Corynebacterium
- Species: C. glutamicum

Binomial name
- Corynebacterium glutamicum (Kinoshita et al. 1958) Abe et al. 1967 (Approved Lists 1980)

Synonyms
- Brevibacterium divaricatum Su and Yamada 1960 (Approved Lists 1980); "Brevibacterium flavum" Okumura et al. 1962; Corynebacterium lilium Lee and Good 1963 (Approved Lists 1980); "Micrococcus glutamicus" Kinoshita et al. 1958

Species of bacterium

Corynebacterium glutamicum is a Gram-positive, rod-shaped bacterium that is used industrially for large-scale production of amino acids, especially glutamic acid and lysine. While originally identified in a screen for organisms secreting L-glutamate, mutants of C. glutamicum have also been identified that produce various other amino acids and derivatives of amino acids.

Due to its industrial importance, several clones of C. glutamicum have been sequenced by both industry and academic groups. Furthermore, small RNA data was obtained by RNA-Seq in C. glutamicum ATCC 13032. The metabolism of this strain has been reconstructed and is available in the form of a genome-scale metabolic model.

== See also ==
- List of sequenced bacterial genomes
