= Superficial pustular folliculitis =

- Other names: Impetigo of Bockhart and Superficial folliculitis
- Specialty: Dermatology

Superficial pustular folliculitis is a superficial folliculitis with thin-walled pustules at the follicular openings.

== See also ==
- Streptococcal intertrigo
- List of cutaneous conditions
