= Hoyle's agar =

Selective bacterial growth medium

Hoyle's agar is a selective medium for culture devised by Leslie Hoyle of the University of Leeds in the UK. Hoyle outlined the background, formulation, preparation, properties and performance in the article A Tellurite Blood-Agar Medium for the Rapid Diagnosis of Diphtheria published in The Lancet in February 1941.

The medium uses tellurite to differentially select Corynebacterium diphtheriae from other upper respiratory tract flora. It appears cream to yellow colored and takes the form of a free-floating powder. It is a modification of Neill's medium although Hoyle stated in the article that "it bears little relation to the Neill's medium from which it was derived [...]".

Hoyle's tellurite agar contains:

Proteose peptone	10 g/L
Beef extract	10 g/L
Sodium chloride	5 g/L
Blood, laked	
Tellurite	0.35 g/L
Agar	15 g/L

The medium inhibits growth of Gram-negative bacteria and many Gram-positive bacteria, and reduction of the tellurite is characteristic of corynebacteria (though not entirely exclusive to them). Microscopic examination of samples of suspected colonies, using Neisser differential staining, is required for confirmation.
