= Corynebacterium bovis =

Scientific classification
- Domain: Bacteria
- Kingdom: Bacillati
- Phylum: Actinomycetota
- Class: Actinomycetes
- Order: Mycobacteriales
- Family: Corynebacteriaceae
- Genus: Corynebacterium
- Species: C. bovis

Binomial name
- Corynebacterium bovis Bergey et al. 1923 (Approved Lists 1980)

Species of bacteria

Corynebacterium bovis is a pathogenic bacterium that causes mastitis and pyelonephritis in cattle.

C. bovis is a facultatively anaerobic, Gram-positive organism, characterized by nonencapsulated, nonsporulated, immobile, straight or curved rods with a length of 1 to 8 μm and width of 0.3 to 0.8 μm, which forms ramified aggregations in culture (looking like "Chinese characters").

In mastitic infections, C. bovis is spread from cow to cow most commonly through improper milking technique. However, it is usually a mild infection resulting in an elevated somatic cell count. The bacterium is sensitive to the majority of antibiotics, such as the penicillins, ampicillin, cephalosporins, quinolones, chloramphenicol, tetracyclines, cefuroxime, and trimethoprim.
