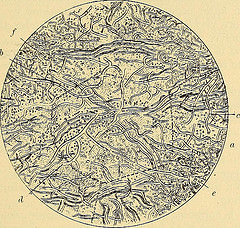

Scientific classification
- Domain: Bacteria
- Kingdom: Bacillati
- Phylum: Actinomycetota
- Class: Actinomycetes
- Order: Mycobacteriales
- Family: Corynebacteriaceae
- Genus: Corynebacterium
- Species: C. minutissimum

Binomial name
- Corynebacterium minutissimum (ex Sarkany et al. 1962) Collins and Jones 1983

Type strain
- ATCC 23348; CCUG 541; CIP 100652; DSM 20651; IFO 15361; JCM 9387; NBRC 15361; NCTC 10288

= Corynebacterium minutissimum =

Species of bacterium

Corynebacterium minutissimum is a species of Corynebacterium associated with erythrasma, a type of skin rash. It can be distinguished from similar-appearing rashes by exposing the area to the light of a Wood's lamp; C. minutissimum produces porphyrins that fluoresce coral-red.
