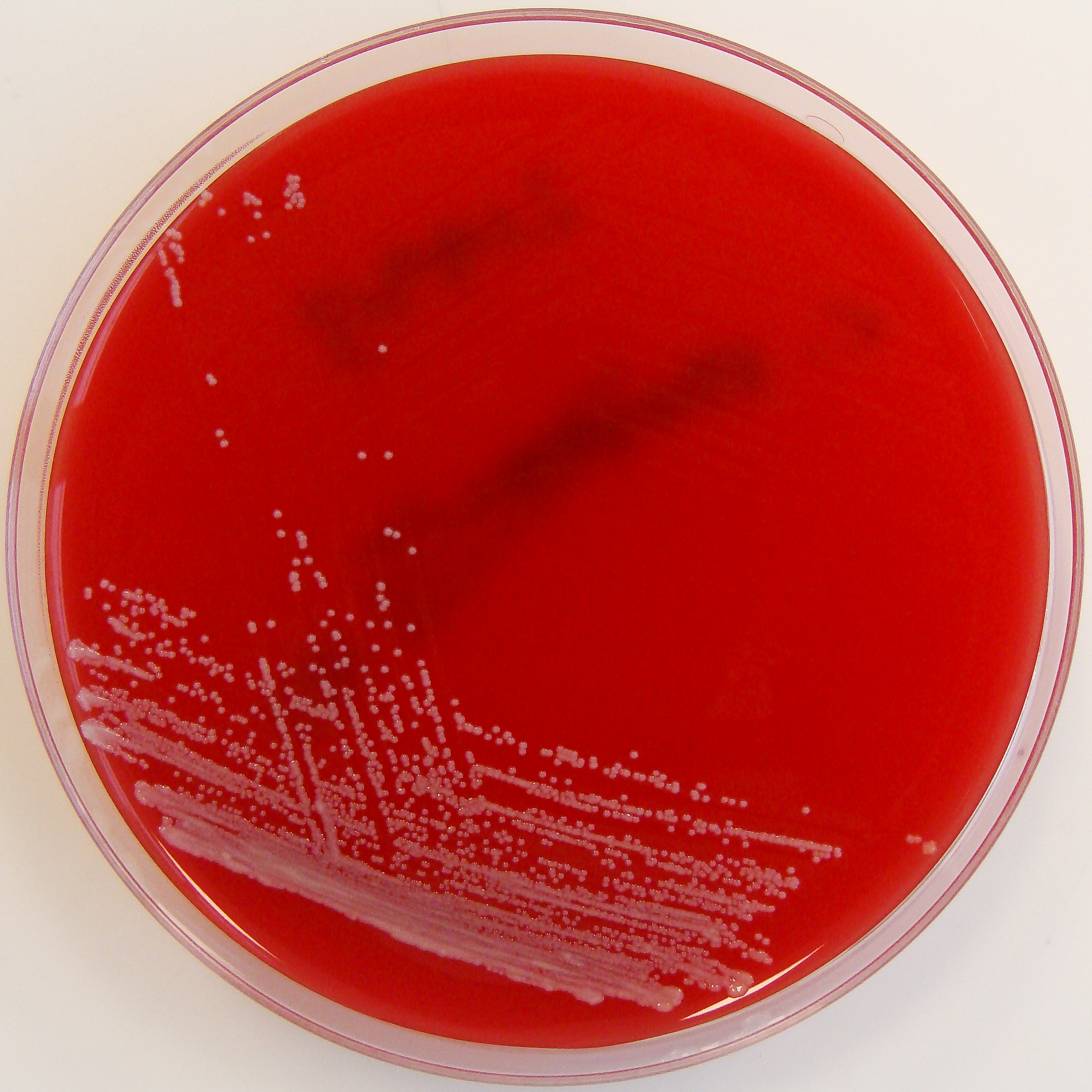
- Corynebacterium striatum on Columbia Horse Blood Agar (HBA)

Scientific classification
- Domain: Bacteria
- Kingdom: Bacillati
- Phylum: Actinomycetota
- Class: Actinomycetes
- Order: Mycobacteriales
- Family: Corynebacteriaceae
- Genus: Corynebacterium
- Species: C. striatum

Binomial name
- Corynebacterium striatum (Chester 1901) Eberson 1918 (Approved Lists 1980)

= Corynebacterium striatum =

Species of bacterium

Corynebacterium striatum is a bacterium that is a member of the Corynebacterium genus. It is classified as non-diphtheritic. The bacterium is a gram-positive prokaryote that assumes a 'club-like' morphology, more formally known as a corynebacteria structure. It is non-lipophilic and undergoes aerobic respiration. It is a facultative anaerobe. It is catalase negative and is an oxidase positive glucose and sucrose fermenter.

It is generally found as a ubiquitous microorganism and as a commensal of humans that colonises the nasopharynx. It has recently been recognised as an emerging pathogen although the genus of Corynebacterium is not usually considered to be pathogenic. Particularly in the context of human disease, Corynebacterium striatum is generally considered an opportunistic pathogen. This is particularly in a nosocomial setting. It has been recorded to infect the skin and the upper and lower respiratory tract and even disseminate - resulting in sepsis. Recent interest has been sparked in the microorganism, as it is known to be resistant to and gaining resistance to many antibiotics.

== History ==
Corynebacterium striatum is a member of the genus Corynebacterium. Initially, the species was described in 1901. Scientific papers dating back until approximately 1980 recount cases of commensal Corynebacterium striatum contaminating samples from sites of infections. A paper published in 1993 found that isolates of described Corynebacterium Striatum stored by the American Type Culture Collection and the National Collection of Type Cultures were in fact not that of Corynebacterium striatum, although the recorded sequences corresponded with other known isolates of the species. Thus, it was determined that - at the time of isolation for storage - the incorrect bacterial species had been stored. Up until 1993, there had only been three documented cases of respiratory infections caused by the species. Afterwards, it was formally defined again in 1995. For a long time, Coryneform bacteria had been described as commensals of humans - colonising the skin and mucous membranes without causing disease. More recently, Corynebacterium striatum was found to, in fact, be the cause of infection or disease if given the opportunity. Early clinical testing of hospital patients found that infection generally only occurred in immunocompromised individuals or those that had some form of prosthetic device permanently or intermittently fitted. Not long thereafter, researchers began to propose the notion that Corynebacterium striatum was the cause of disease even in patients that did not meet such criteria.

== Characteristics ==
=== Identification ===
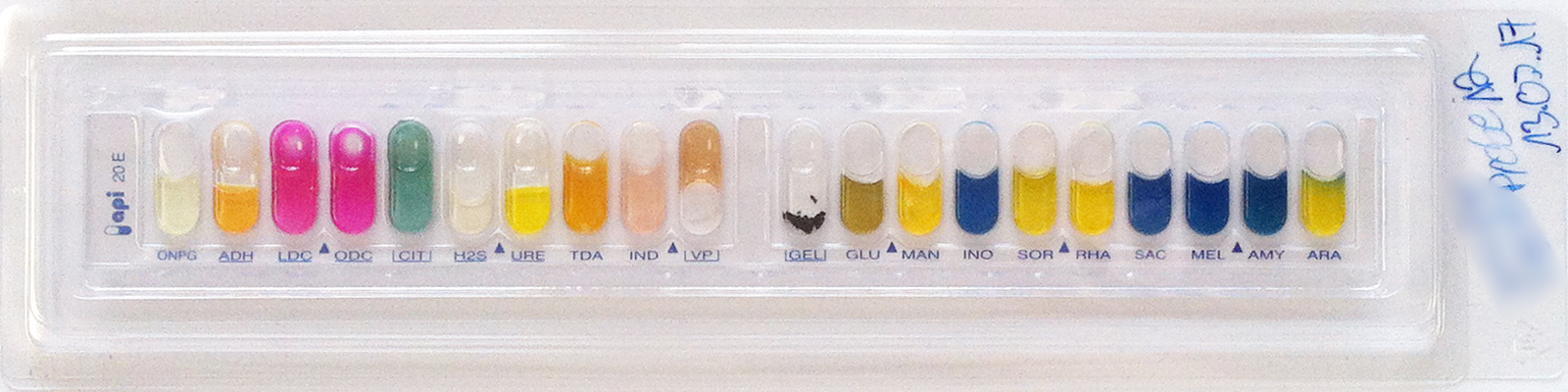
API Strip. A series of standardised and controlled biochemical tests used in the identification of specific bacterial species.

Standardised methods of identification have been developed to improve the identification and isolation of Coronyforms. One such method is the API Coryne V2.0 system. API strips combine a series of small scale biochemical tests to distinguish key characteristics of a bacterium, based on metabolic activity. The results are interpreted via standardised indicators and charts. This is a cost-effective, yet time-consuming method of identification taking approximately 16 hours. This is specifically in clinical settings.

More modern identification techniques include genome sequencing – particularly 16S Ribosomal RNA (rRNA) Sequencing. This technique relies on computerised comparison of genome sequences between bacteria. The 16S rRNA sequence is highly conserved between bacteria - although it will show slight variations and mutations between strains. Comparison of variations in the Corynebacterium genome allow for specific identification of the Corynebacterium Striatum. This is currently a relatively expensive method of identification, compared to the API strip, although this is improving as technologies improve. The MALDI-TOF system is a clinically relevant method of detection that provides a rapid (10 minute) identification of specific bacteria.

Both biochemical and molecular identification are accompanied by physical characterisation. Culturing the bacteria on blood cultures and gram staining to confirm morphology are integral additions to the process of identification.

=== Physical ===
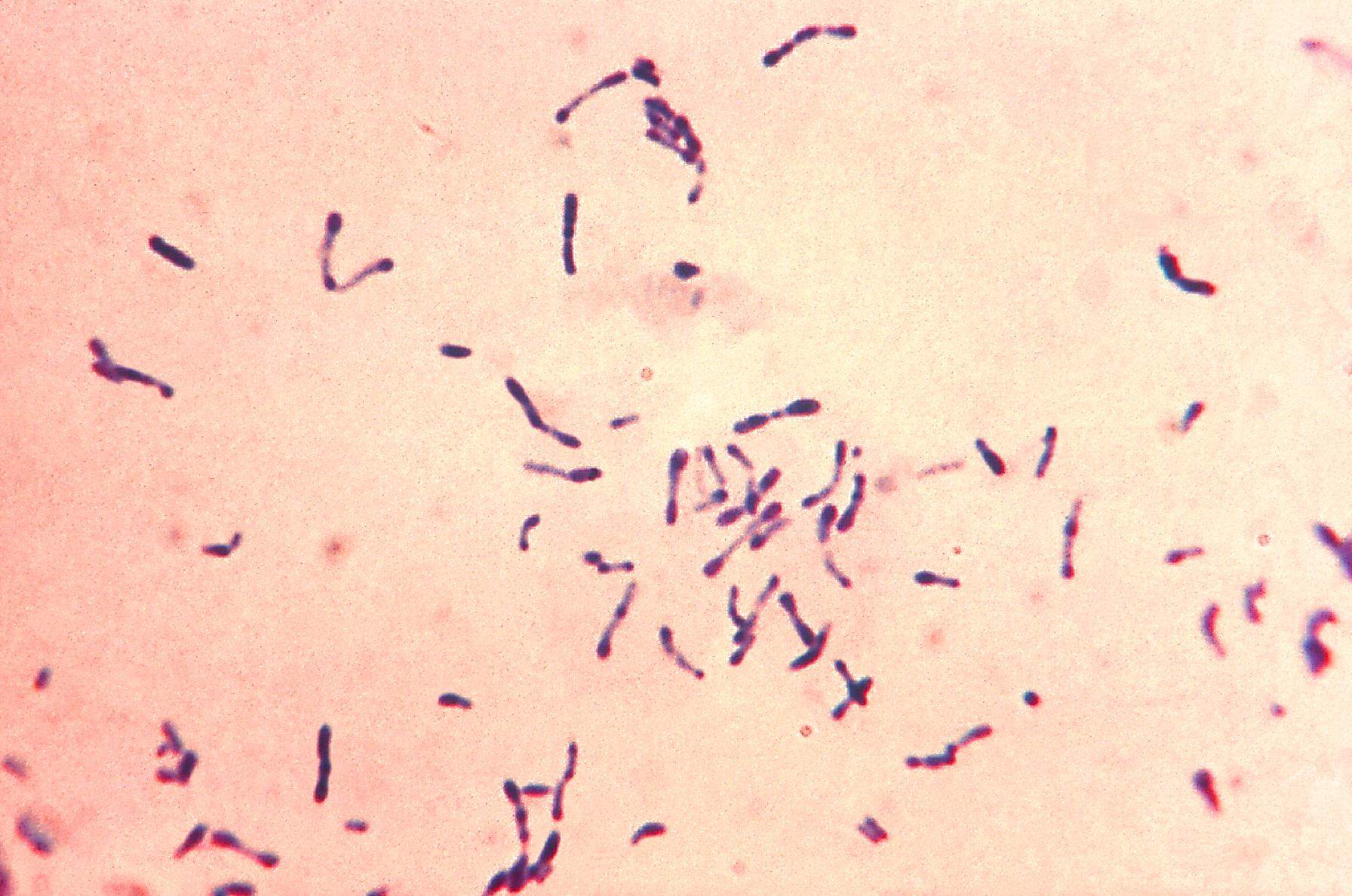
Corynebacterium diphtheriae Gram stain. The purple colour of the bacterium is indicative of the thin peptidoglycan wall surrounding the bacterium. The 'club-like' structure can be observed. This an example of a Coryneform bacterium.

Corynebacterium striatum is a gram-positive bacterium. It has a thin external peptidoglycan cell wall structure. It has been described as having an irregular pleomorphic shape and is non-motile. Under a microscope, it appears to have a hybrid of the bacillus and cocci morphology with a bulged pole attached to a rod-like end, more commonly described as a 'club-like' structure. It is widely described as being 1.5-8.0 micrometers in length, but formal measurement of individual clinical isolates will vary upon observation. C. striatum colonies are able to be plated in vitro; when growing on Blood Agar the colonies will appear as small (1-2mm diameter) with a white, moist, and smooth appearance. It is otherwise called a diphtheroid or coryneform due to its close phylogenetic relationship with diphtheria causing bacterium Corynebacterium diphtheriae.

=== Molecular/biochemical ===
Corynebacterium striatum can be differentiated from other Corynebacterium types based on its ability to ferment glucose and sucrose, and inability to ferment maltose. In comparison to other members of the genus Corynebacterium, it ferments sugars rapidly. Corynebacterium species are also known to ferment nitrates. It is able to hydrolyze Tyrosine and Pyrazinamide. It does not metabolize urease, can hydrolyze esculin and can also ferment mannitol and xylose. In a laboratory setting, it is best distinguished from other coronyforms through its fermentative activity. These bacteria are non-lipophilic and prefer to persist. Strain-specific genome-scale metabolic models have been reconstructed for the C. striatum strains 1054, 1197, 1115, and 1116.

=== Virulence factor ===
The organism itself possesses few virulence factors, giving it the title of an opportunistic colonizer as opposed to a true pathogen. Virulence arises from its antibiotic resistance properties. The increasing acquisition of antibiotic resistance genes allow for pathogenesis of Corynebacterium striatum via colonisation.

== Antibiotic resistance ==
Antibiotic resistance is the acquisition of resistance to antibiotic treatments through either horizontal gene transfer or genetic mutation. The acquisition of such characteristics by Corynebacterium striatum is relevant to its occurrence as a pathogen.

One study found that 93.7% of Corynebacterium striatum strains isolated showed resistance to at least one of the antimicrobial compounds tested. In this experiment, 82.5% of strains expressed resistance to the antibiotic penicillin. Researchers deduced that due to the long-term exposure of Corynebacterium striatum to Penicillin, resistance had been acquired by most isolates. In the same experiment, multi-drug resistance was observed in 49.2% of strains.

Corynebacterium striatum has been found to carry the bla gene. This gene encodes a class A β-lactamase. β-lactamase are a group of antimicrobial enzymes that work to counter the effect of β-lactam antibiotics such as ampicillin and penicillin.

Further genes associated with antibiotic resistance include, but are not limited to: the gyrA gene that is attributed to resistance to the major antibiotic group fluoroquinolones, the aph(3′)-Ic gene imparting resistance to kanamycin and aph(3″)-Ib and aph(6)-Id causing resistance to streptomycin. Researchers also found that the erm (X) gene causes resistance to erythromycin.

== Disease ==
Infection with Corynebacterium striatum was initially thought to occur through self-infection, transmitting the bacteria from a site where it persists as commensal and then allowing it to colonise as a pathogen. It is now understood that it can be transmitted from person to person, particularly in a hospital setting.

While Corynebacterium infections are not common, they have been observed in individuals with prosthetic devices or those who are immunosuppressed. When detected under these conditions, it is considered a true pathogen. Non-diphtheria Corynebacterium types are also being recognised for their impact on those suffering from long term respiratory disease.

=== Infection ===
Many cases of infection by Corynebacterium striatum have been documented with particular relevance to acquisition of infection in hospitals – otherwise known as a nosocomial infection. Corynebacterium striatum has been known to colonize prosthetics, particularly heart valves, prosthetic joints and even intravenous apparatuses such as catheters. Infections of this type have been described as a local infection or as capable of developing into a more widespread disseminated infection otherwise known as bacteraemia. Other documented infections include osteomyelitis, a bone infection that can occur through blood-borne infection or injury to the bone itself.

One of the first described infections of an individual with Corynebacterium striatum occurred in 1980. The man was severely immunocompromised, already suffering from leukemia. After this, a number of isolated cases were documented. A well documented outbreak - at the Hospital Joan March - Mallorca, Spain, saw 21 individuals infected with Corynebacterium striatum. The individuals all suffered from chronic obstructive pulmonary disease (COPD), and also received significant tobacco exposure throughout their lives, and as such were consistently being admitted to the hospital where they were treated by care staff with shared equipment. In this instance, Corynebacterium striatum was causing infection in the respiratory tract of patients and detected in sputum samples. Of the 21 cases in the outbreak, there were six associated deaths.

Another study of infection by Corynebacterium striatum described a patient who was admitted to hospital for cardiac arrest treatment in 2008. During her stay, the patient was fitted with a central venous catheter through which she contracted bacteremia of Corynebacterium striatum which resulted in her death. The patient's age and immuno-compromised state resulting from pre-existing kidney failure ultimately allowed for the establishment and dissemination of infection.

There is little to no evidence for Corynebacterium Striatum infection of or colonizing of animal specimens.

=== Treatment ===
Multidrug resistance is the main factor considered when treating disease caused by Corynebacterium striatum. Treatment with a mix of broad-spectrum antibiotics may thus be necessary. The selection of further antibiotic resistance is a serious consideration that must be made when selecting patient treatment. A study about the occurrence of non-diphtheroid infections determined that of all bacteria tested, Corynebacterium Striatum had the highest occurrence, accounting for 47% of infections. In the same study, it was determined that all non-diphtheroid corynebacterium were susceptible to treatment with vancomycin, quinupristin-dalfopristin, linezolid and gentamicin. While multiple studies confirmed that vancomycin was highly effective on all isolated species. Previously it was known that Coronybacterium were susceptible to β-lactams, tetracycline, and fluoroquinolones, but recently, resistance genes to such treatments have been observed in clinical isolates. Similar resistance was noted in a study with all isolates showing resistance to ciprofloxacin. Of significant clinical significance is a rising resistance to beta-lactams in the last two decades, a group of antibiotics that includes penicillin. Suggested oral treatments include a class of oxazolidinones - linezolid. Although treatment with linezolid is not often prescribed, it can affect liver function and have negative side effects such as headaches and nausea. Although differing results of susceptibility to antibiotic treatment have been noted between experiments, such specific susceptibility of isolates should be obtained through antibiotic sensitivity testing. In clinical situations, the antibiotic sensitivity can be obtained through disk diffusion assays of E-strip test. Treatment of clinical cases, such as the outbreak at the Hospital Joan March, were treated case by case, based on the antibiogram obtained from each patient's sputum sample.

More broadly, prevention of initial infection, particularly in a hospital setting, is a key element of treatment. Sterilising all surfaces, and prostheses, as well as constantly replacing and maintaining prosthesis, is an integral element of stopping disease establishment.
