= Uropygial gland =

Gland found in some birds

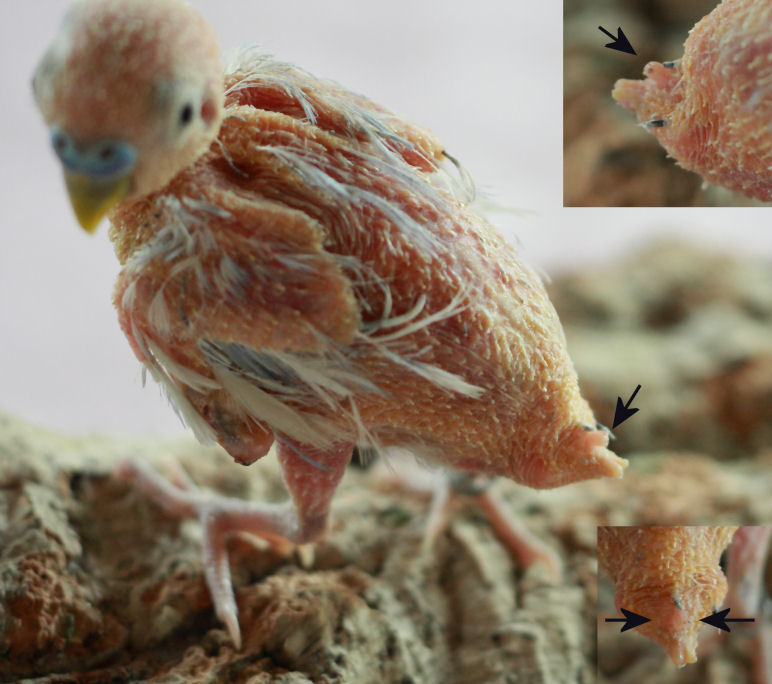
Position of the uropygial gland, indicated on a budgerigar

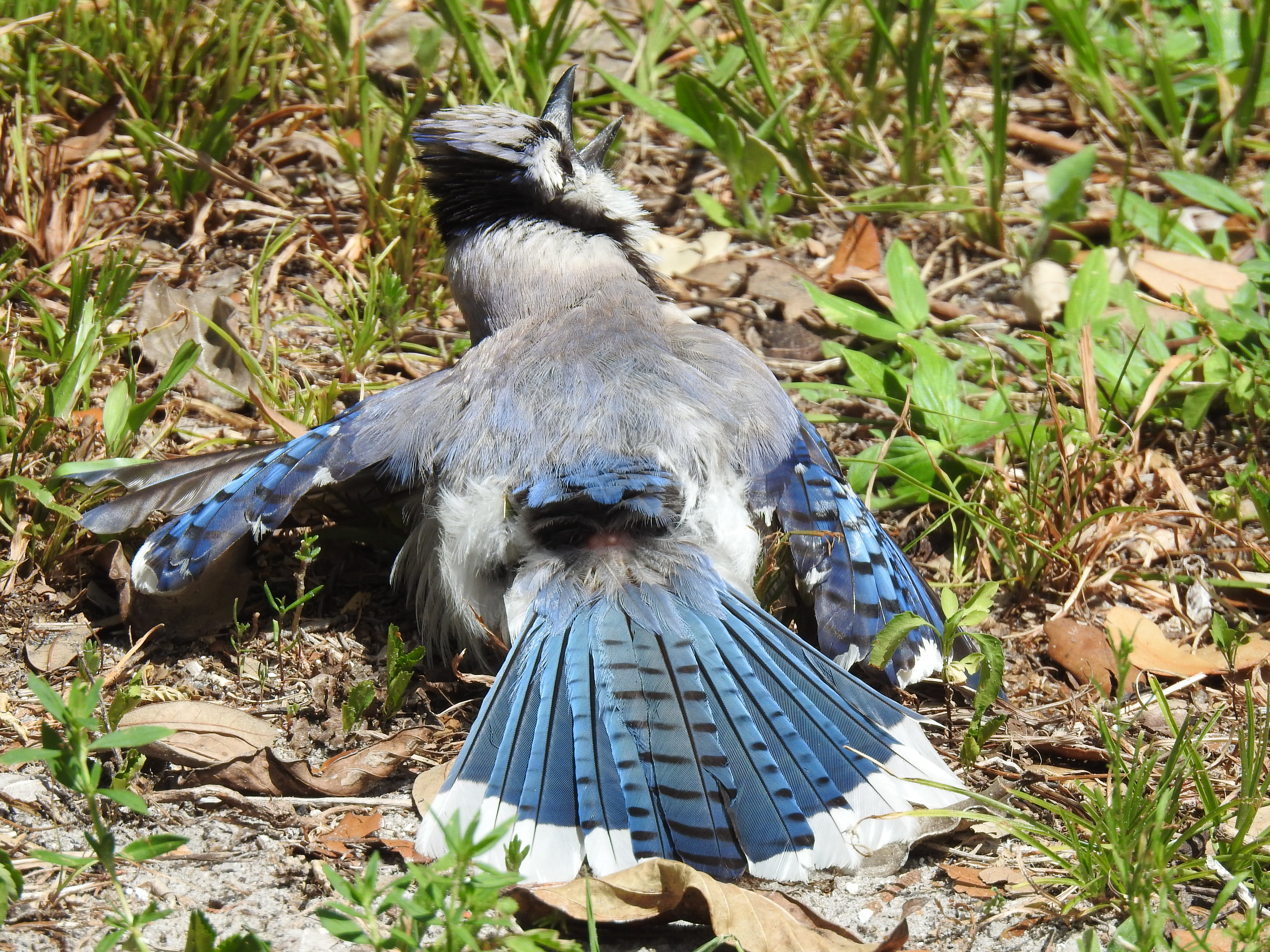
Uropygial gland of a blue jay

The uropygial gland, informally known as the preen gland or the oil gland, is a bilobed sebaceous gland possessed by the majority of birds used to distribute the gland's oil through the plumage by means of preening. It is located dorsally at the base of the tail (between the fourth caudal vertebra and the pygostyle) and is greatly variable in both shape and size. In some species, the opening of the gland has a small tuft of feathers to provide a wick for the preen oil (see below). It is a holocrine gland enclosed in a connective tissue capsule made up of glandular acini that deposit their oil secretion into a common collector tube ending in a variable number of pores (openings), most typically two. Each lobe has a central cavity that collects the secretion from tubules arranged radially around the cavity. The gland secretion is conveyed to the surface via ducts that, in most species, open at the top of a papilla (nipple-like structure).

== Etymology ==
From uropygium: Medieval Latin, from Ancient Greek οὐροπύγιον (ouropugion), from οὐρά (oura) 'tail' and πυγή (puge) 'rump'.

== Distribution amongst species ==
The gland is invariably present during embryonic development, whereas it can be vestigial in adults of certain orders, families, genera and species. Some or all species in at least nine families of birds lack a uropygial gland, mostly the ones unable to fly or the ones that produce powder down for feather maintenance. These include kiwis (Apterygidae), emu (Dromaiidae), ostriches (Struthionidae), rheas (Rheidae), cassowaries (Casuariidae), mesites (Mesitornithidae), bustards (Otididae), pigeons and doves (Columbidae), amazon parrots (Psittacidae), frogmouths (Podargidae), and woodpeckers (Picidae). These birds typically find other means to stay clean and dry, such as taking a dust bath. Researchers have been unable to correlate the presence or absence of the uropygial gland with factors such as distribution, climate, ecology, or flightlessness.

== Gland secretion ==
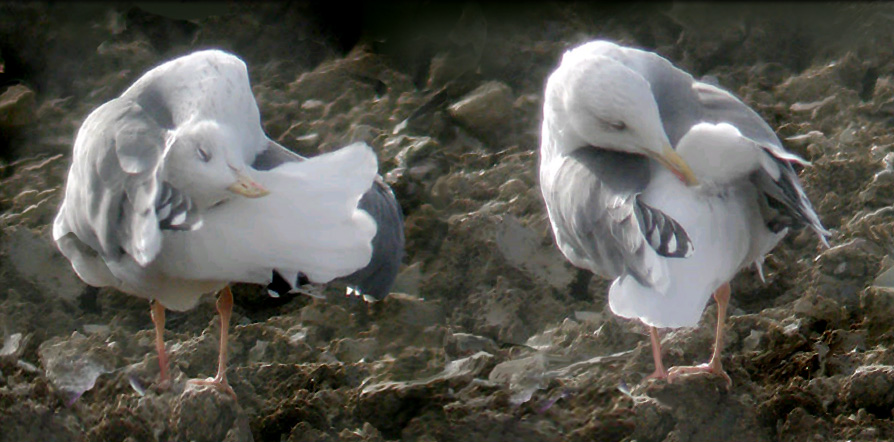
European herring gull (Larus argentatus): The bird on the right is uncovering its uropygial gland to distribute the gland's oil through the plumage by means of preening. The bird on the left is pushing its head towards its uropygial gland.

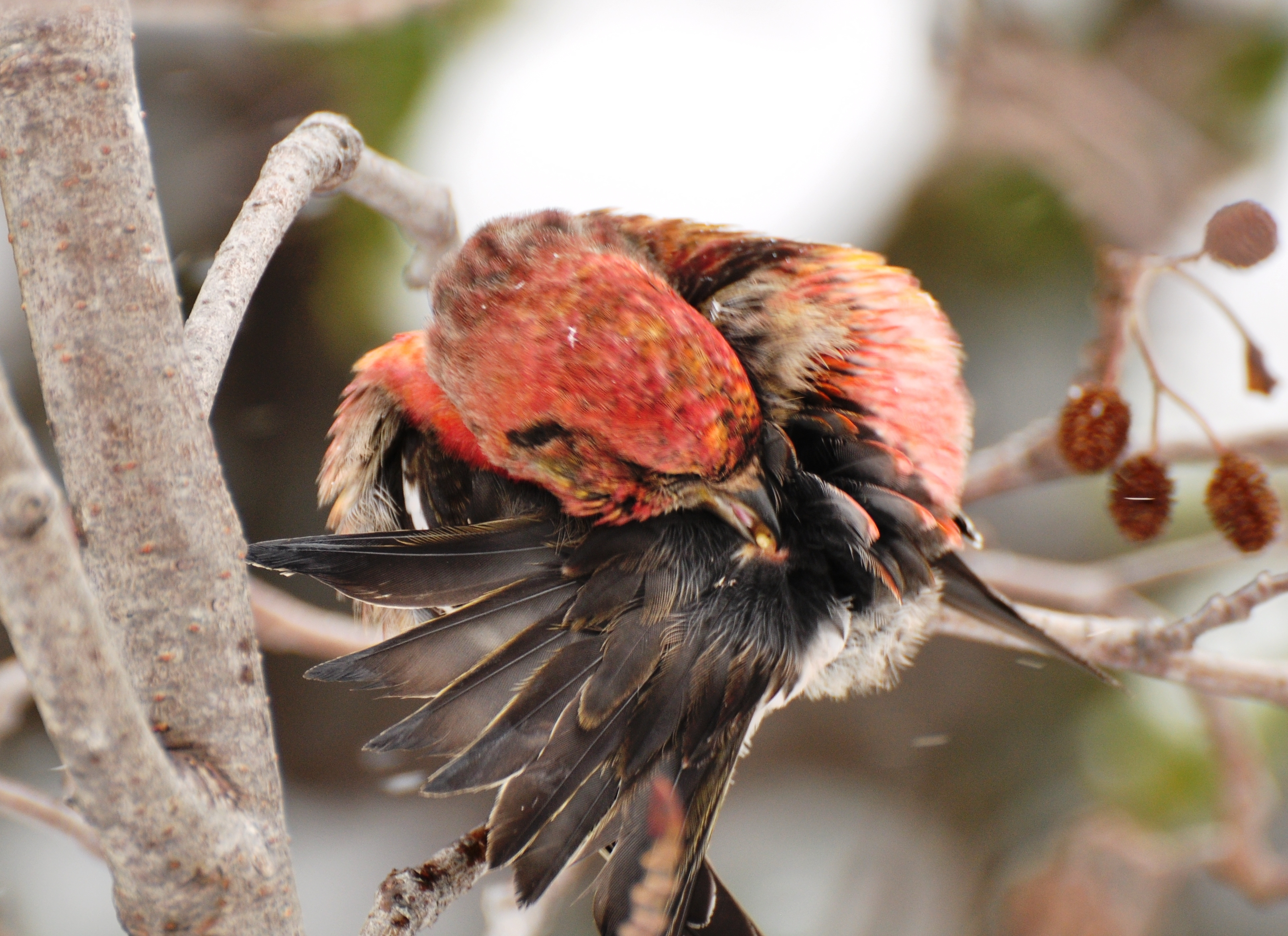
White-winged crossbill (Loxia leucoptera) extracting preen oil from its uropygial gland

The uropygial gland secretes an oil (preen oil) through the dorsal surface of the skin via a grease nipple-like nub or papilla. The oil contains a complex and variable mixture of substances formed greatly of aliphatic monoester waxes, formed of fatty acids and monohydroxy wax alcohols. However, some types of diester waxes called uropygiols and containing hydroxy fatty acids and/or alkanediols exist in the secretions of the uropygial gland of some groups of birds. Preen gland secretion of some, but not all, birds have shown to be antimicrobial. Some birds harbor bacteria in their preen gland, which to date, have (exclusively) been isolated from preen glands (e.g. Enterococcus phoeniculicola and Corynebacterium uropygiale). Some of those bacteria add to the antimicrobial properties of preen wax.

A bird will typically transfer preen oil to its body during preening by rubbing its beak and head against the gland opening and then rubbing the accumulated oil on the feathers of the body and wings, and on the skin of the feet and legs. Tailward areas are usually preened utilizing the beak, although some species, such as budgerigars, use the feet to apply the oil to feathers around the vent.

== History ==
Emperor Frederick II, in his thirteenth-century treatise on falconry, was seemingly the first to discuss the function of the uropygial gland of birds. He believed that its product not only oiled the plumage but also provided a poison which was introduced by the claws of hawks and owls thus bringing quicker death to their prey. However, studies in 1678 on the question of the toxic nature of the uropygial gland secretion found no evidence to support Frederick's contention.

== Function ==
Several researchers have reported differences in the relative gland weights attributing them to factors like seasonal changes, habitat, body weight, inter-individual variations, and sex. Significant differences are found in the relative gland size between males and females in most species, however, no coherent explanation has as yet been found for these results. Many ornithologists believe the function of the uropygial gland differs among various species of birds.

=== Feather and body integrity ===
Preen oil is believed to help maintain the integrity of feathers. In waterbirds, preen oil maintains the flexibility of feathers and keeps feather barbules from breaking. The interlocking barbules, when in good condition, form a barrier that helps repel water (see below). In some species, preen oil is also believed to maintain the integrity of the horny beak and the scaly skin of the legs and feet. It has also been speculated that in some species, preen oil contains a precursor of vitamin D; this precursor is converted to vitamin D by the action of sunlight and then absorbed through the skin.

=== Courtship and pheromone production ===
Some researchers have postulated that the change in preen oil viscosity may be related to the formation of the more brilliant plumage required for courtship, although later research did not find support for this idea. The results of other studies suggest that the gland in females may be involved in the production and secretion of lipids with female pheromone activity.

=== Waterproofing effect ===
The uropygial gland is strongly developed in many waterbirds, such as ducks, petrels, pelicans and in the osprey, and sometimes in non-aquatic species, such as the oilbird. A study examining the gland's mass relative to body weight in 126 bird species showed the absence of a clear-cut correlation between the gland's mass and the degree of birds' contact with water. Anecdotal reports indicating that the waterproofing effect of the hydrophobic uropygiols might be increased by electrostatic charge to the oiled feather through the mechanical action of preening are not supported by scientific studies.

=== Antiparasitic effect ===
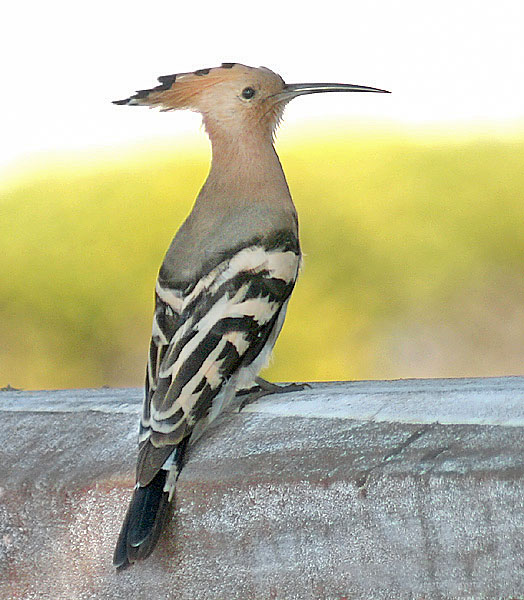
Hoopoes host symbiotic bacteria in their uropygial glands whose secretions act against feather-degrading bacteria.

The taxonomic richness of avian louse burdens covaries positively with uropygial gland size (relative to body size) across avian taxa, suggesting coevolution between gland size and parasite biodiversity. The hoopoe (Upupa epops) uropygial gland harbours symbiotic bacteria whose excretions reduce the activity of feather-degrading bacteria and thus help to preserve the plumage.

In vitro studies suggest that the preen oils of rock doves (Columba livia) are effective against lice, however in vivo studies which removed the preen gland from captive birds had no significant effect on louse loads over the course of four months (but did reduce plumage quality), suggesting that preen oil may not be an important defense against lice in this species. Similarly, there was no evidence to support a role of the gland secretion in attracting biting midges and black flies in blue tits (Cyanistes caeruleus) and feral pigeons (Columba livia).

=== Cosmetic effect ===
Secretions of the uropygial gland of greater flamingos (Phoenicopterus roseus) contain carotenoids, organic pigments which give flamingos their pink colour. During the breeding season, greater flamingos increase the frequency of their spreading uropygial secretions over their feathers and thereby enhance their colour. This cosmetic use of uropygial secretions has been described as applying "make-up".

=== Chemical composition ===
The biochemical composition of preen oil has been reported to significantly vary among birds in several ways: for example, the qualitative and quantitative content of the volatile compounds, chain length of diols, lipid concentration, ester saturation, type of fatty acids and their percentage composition. This variation is due to a range of factors, including species, age, sex and season. In chickens, a limited number of studies have investigated the specific effect of diet on the fatty acid composition of preen oil in meat chickens. The preen oil of meat chickens is dominated by saturated fatty acids, which make up to 97% of the total fatty acids, with 13 different medium to long chain saturated fatty acids (C8:0 to C22:0) detected. The preen oil contained several odd-chain fatty acids, which suggests they may be derived from lipolysis by the uropygial gland and/or its microbiome. Diet and gender had small but significant effects on levels of specific saturated fatty acid in the preen oil. The fatty acid composition of the preen oil did not reflect the more diverse fatty acid compositions of the diet or whole blood. Therefore, this clearly indicate that measuring the fatty acid profile of preen oil is not a suitable alternative approach for predicting the fatty acid composition of the blood of meat chickens.

== See also ==
- Sebaceous gland
