= Decaprenyl-phosphate phosphoribosyltransferase =

Class of enzymes

Identifiers
- EC no.: 2.4.2.45

Databases
- IntEnz: IntEnz view
- BRENDA: BRENDA entry
- ExPASy: NiceZyme view
- KEGG: KEGG entry
- MetaCyc: metabolic pathway
- PRIAM: profile
- PDB structures: RCSB PDB PDBe PDBsum
Search
- PMC: articles
- PubMed: articles
- NCBI: proteins

Decaprenyl-phosphate phosphoribosyltransferase (EC 2.4.2.45, 5-phospho-alpha-D-ribose-1-diphosphate:decaprenyl-phosphate 5-phosphoribosyltransferase, 5-phospho-alpha-D-ribose 1-pyrophosphate:decaprenyl phosphate 5-phosphoribosyltransferase, DPPR synthase, Rv3806) is an enzyme with systematic name trans,octacis-decaprenylphospho-beta-D-ribofuranose 5-phosphate:diphosphate phospho-alpha-D-ribosyltransferase. This enzyme catalyses the following chemical reaction

trans,octacis-decaprenyl phosphate + 5-phospho-alpha-D-ribose 1-diphosphate $\rightleftharpoons$ trans,octacis-decaprenylphospho-beta-D-ribofuranose 5-phosphate + diphosphate

This enzyme requires Mg^{2+}. It is isolated from Mycobacterium tuberculosis.
