= Corynebacterium uropygiale =

Scientific classification
- Domain: Bacteria
- Kingdom: Bacillati
- Phylum: Actinomycetota
- Class: Actinomycetes
- Order: Mycobacteriales
- Family: Corynebacteriaceae
- Genus: Corynebacterium
- Species: C. uropygiale

Binomial name
- Corynebacterium uropygiale Braun et al. 2016

Species of prokaryote

Corynebacterium uropygiale is a bacterium described in 2016 following thorough investigations using a polyphasic approach including MALDI-TOF mass spectrometry, phylogeny of 16S rRNA and rpoB genes and DNA fingerprinting. To date, it has been regarded as endemic to preen gland secretions of healthy turkeys (Meleagris gallopavo). It is a member of the genus Corynebacterium, which belongs to the phylum Actinomycetota. Although a large number of bacteria including corynebacteria have been reported as part of the normal microbiome of birds, C. uropygiale is the only member of the genus that has been recovered in preen gland secretions of birds. It is one of three bacterial species to have been found to colonize preen gland secretions of birds.

== Culture conditions ==
C. uropygiale grows on complex media supplemented with monounsaturated fatty acids (e. g. lysogeny broth (LB) agar supplemented with 0.3% Tween-80). On such media, luxurious growth is obtained after 48 h of incubation at 37°C. C. uropygiale can also be grown on Columbia agar containing 5% sheep blood, but faint growth is obtained. C. uropygiale does not show significant growth on media, such as LB, tryptic-soy agar, or Mueller–Hinton agar. The presence or absence of CO_{2} does not influence growth characteristics.

== Characteristics ==
C. uropygiale is a fastidious, club-shaped, Gram-positive, rod that assembles in palisades and V-shaped patterns. They are non-acid fast and non-spore-forming facultative anaerobes. Their cell walls contain mycolic acids. G+C content accounts for 60.7 mol% in the type strain. The closest relative is C. spheniscorum, which has been recovered from the Magellanic penguin (Spheniscus magellanicus).

== Lipophilism ==
C. uropygiale is capable of proliferating in lipid-rich environments, such as the preen gland. It uses the fatty acids of its surroundings rather than synthesizing them by itself. C. uropygiale has adapted its metabolism to its habitat, as it lost the ability to produce these fatty acids by itself. In terms of evolution, this saves energy and potentially increases fitness.
