= Corynebacterium amycolatum =

Scientific classification
- Domain: Bacteria
- Kingdom: Bacillati
- Phylum: Actinomycetota
- Class: Actinomycetes
- Order: Mycobacteriales
- Family: Corynebacteriaceae
- Genus: Corynebacterium
- Species: C. amycolatum

Binomial name
- Corynebacterium amycolatum Collins et al 1988

Species of prokaryote

Corynebacterium amycolatum is a gram-positive, non-spore-forming, aerobic or facultatively anaerobic bacillus capable of fermentation with propionic acid as the major end product of its glucose metabolism. C. amycolatum is a common component of the natural flora found on human skin and mucous membranes, and therefore is an occasional contaminant in human blood cultures but can rarely cause infections such as endocarditis.

== Identification ==
First described in 1988, C. amycolatum is one of the diphtheroid most often isolated from clinical samples. However, it is often difficult to differentiate from other fermentative corynebacteria such as C. minutissimum and C. xerosis, both of which are known human pathogens. One method of differentiation, however, is by observing the cell wall. Unlike other members of this genus, C. amycolatum lacks mycolic acid, long fatty acids usually found in the cell wall. C. amycolatum also differs in its colony morphology; the species characteristically produces flat, whitish-gray, matte or waxy colonies on Schaedler blood agar. Its antibiotic sensitivity may also aid in its identification; the organism is generally resistant to multiple antibiotics. Because of its relatively new status as a pathogen, however, no standard laboratory tests yet identify C. amycolatum.

== Disease ==
C. amycolatum has been shown to cause pneumonia, peritonitis, empyema, infectious endocarditis, and fatal sepsis, most of which occur as nosocomial infections. As an opportunistic pathogen, the bacterium is pathogenic in immunocompromised patients, mostly infecting those with underlying heart defects or intravascular devices. Corynebacterium endocarditis usually infects the left side of the heart in males, though C. amycolatum has shown a predilection for women. While cases of disease have been small in number, this underreporting could be due to misdiagnosis of C. amycolatum as C. xerosis, which is a known human pathogen.

== Treatment ==
For the few cases thus far, vancomycin or daptomycin has been used in tandem with rifampicin for a duration ranging from four weeks to six months. Valve replacement was also required in some cases of infectious endocarditis. Due to its recent pathogenic status, however, few treatments have been tested, and an optimal treatment regimen has yet to be established.

== Antibiotic resistance ==
One of C. amycolatum's characteristic traits is its resistance to a wide range of antibiotics. Various strains tested have shown resistance to beta lactam antibiotics, lincosamides, macrolides, and quinolones. Multiple drug-resistant strains were mainly isolated from wounds of patients treated in departments of general surgery and vascular surgery. However, the bacterium was shown to be particularly sensitive to glycopeptide and lipopeptide antibiotics.
