= Corynebacterium jeikeium =

Scientific classification
- Domain: Bacteria
- Kingdom: Bacillati
- Phylum: Actinomycetota
- Class: Actinomycetia
- Order: Mycobacteriales
- Family: Corynebacteriaceae
- Genus: Corynebacterium
- Species: C. jeikeium

Binomial name
- Corynebacterium jeikeium Jackman et al. 1988

Synonyms
- Group JK Corynebacterium

Species of bacterium

Corynebacterium jeikeium is a rod-shaped, catalase-positive, aerobic species of Actinomycetota in the genus Corynebacterium. C. jeikeium is pathogenic, typically causing an opportunistic infection seen most frequently in bone marrow transplant patients. C. jeikeium is a strictly aerobic organism and forms tiny grayish white colonies when grown on blood agar.

C. jeikeium is usually susceptible to vancomycin and tetracycline. Resistance to macrolide antibiotics is often encountered.

It can be acquired in hospitals. Its genome has been sequenced.
