= Respiratory system of the horse =

Biological system by which a horse circulates air for the purpose of gaseous exchange

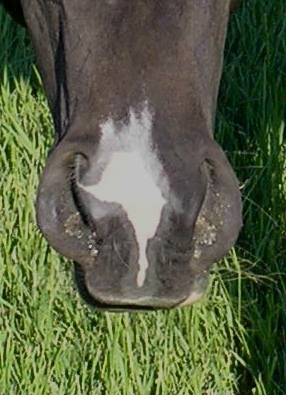
The nostrils of a horse

The respiratory system of the horse is the biological system by which a horse circulates air for the purpose of gaseous exchange.

== Anatomy ==
The respiratory system begins with the nares, commonly known as the nostrils, which can expand greatly during intense exercise. The nostrils have an outer ring made of cartilage (the alar cartilage), which serves to hold them open during inhalation. Additionally, a small pocket within them, called the nasal diverticulum, filters debris with the help of the hairs lining the inner nostril. The nasal cavity contains the nasolacrimal duct, which drains tears from the eyes and out the nose.

The nasal passages contain two conchae on either side, which help to increase the surface area to which the air is exposed. Additionally, the sinuses within the skull are able to drain through the nasal passage. The nasal passage join to the larynx via the pharynx. The pharynx is about 15 cm (5.9 in) long in an adult, and includes the nasopharynx, which protect the entrance to the auditory tubes, the oropharynx, which contains tonsillar tissue, and the laryngopharynx.

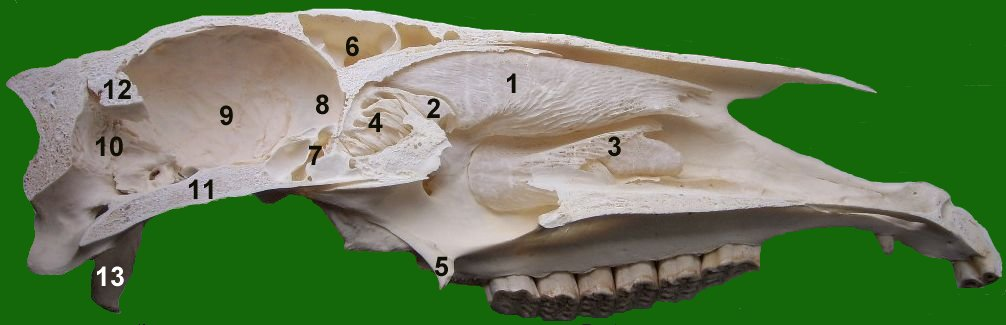
1 Concha nasalis dorsalis, 2 Concha nasalis media, 3 Concha nasalis ventralis, 4 Os ethmoidale, 5 Os pterygoideum, 6 Sinus frontalis, 7 Sinus sphenoidalis

In parallel to the main nasal passages, the horse has a complex system of paranasal sinuses - air filled spaces within the head which communicate with the respiratory tract, and serve to reduce the weight of the head. These consist of:

- Frontal sinuses: occupy the dorsal (top) part of the skull, between the eyes. There are two, one on each side, divided by a bony septum. These communicates with the inside of the conchae, forming the concho-frontal sinuses. Drainage into the nasal passages is via the caudal maxillary sinus.
- Maxillary sinuses: within the maxilla, above the tooth roots. Each is divided into two components, the rostral maxillary sinus in front and the caudal maxillary sinus behind. They do not communicate. In addition, each of these is subdivided into a medial (inside) and lateral (outside) component, by an incomplete bone wall that carries the infraorbital canal containing nerves and blood vessels. The close proximity to the tooth roots mean that as the teeth erupt with age, the maxillary sinuses become larger.
- Sphenopalatine sinuses: within the palatine and sphenoid bones, these connect to the caudal maxillary sinus.

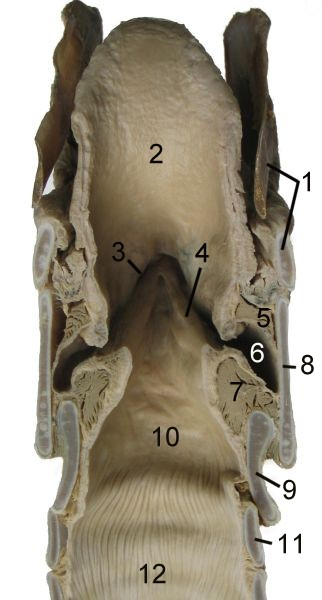
Larynx of the horse: 1 hyoid bone; 2 epiglottis; 3 vestibular fold, false vocal fold/cord, (plica vestibularis); 4 vocal fold, true vocal cord, (plica vocalis); 5 musculus ventricularis; 6 ventricle of larynx (ventriculus laryngis); 7 musculus vocalis; 8 Adam's apple; 9 rings of cartilage; 10 cavum infraglotticum; 11 first bronchial tube cartilage; 12 bronchial tube

A flap of tissue called the soft palate blocks off the pharynx from the mouth (oral cavity) of the horse, except when swallowing. This helps to prevent the horse from inhaling food, but does not allow use of the mouth to breathe when in respiratory distress, a horse can only breathe through its nostrils. For this same reason, horses also cannot pant as a method of thermoregulation.

The genus Equus has a unique part of the respiratory system called the guttural pouch, which is thought to equalize air pressure on the tympanic membrane. These (left and right, separated by a narrow septum) is located in "Vyborg's triangle", between the mandibles but below the occiput. With a capacity of 300 to 500 ml, it fills with air when the horse swallows or exhales.

The larynx lies between the pharynx and the trachea, and is made up of 5 pieces of cartilage which serve to open the glottis. The larynx not only allows the horse to vocalize, but also prevents aspiration of food and helps to control the volume of air inhaled. The trachea is the tube which carries air from the oral cavity and into the lungs, and is about 75–80 cm (30–31 in) in length in the adult. It is held permanently open by 50–60 C-shaped rings of cartilage, 5–6 cm (2.0–2.4 in) in diameter.

At the bifurcation of the trachea, there are two bronchi, the right of which is slightly larger in size. The bronchi then branch into smaller bronchioles, which in turn branch off into smaller bronchioles until they reach the alveoli (which absorb oxygen from the air and releases the carbon dioxide waste). The bronchi and bronchioles are all held within the lungs of the horse, which is located in the animal's thoracic cavity. The lung is made up of a spongy, but very stretchy, material which has 2 lobes on the right and left side (a smaller, apical lobe and a large, caudal lobe) in addition to the accessory lobe. Blood is carried into the lungs via the pulmonary artery, where it is oxygenated at the alveoli and then returned to the heart by the pulmonary veins.

The lungs are expanded with the help of the diaphragm, a muscular sheet of tissue which contracts away from the thoracic cavity, thereby decreasing the pressure and pulling air into the lungs. When fully expanded, the lungs can reach to the 16th rib of the horse.

== Respiration rate of the horse ==
An adult horse has an average rate of respiration at rest of 12 to 24 breaths per minute. Young foals have higher resting respiratory rates than adult horses, usually 36 to 40 breaths per minute. Heat and humidity can raise the respiration rate considerably, especially if the horse has a dark coat and is in the sun. The respiration will often change if the horse becomes excited or distressed, and can therefore be useful in determining the health of the animal.

At the gallop, the horse breathes in rhythm with every stride: as the abdominal muscles pull the hind legs forward in the "suspension phase" of the gallop, the organs within the abdominal cavity are pushed backward from the diaphragm, thereby bringing air into the lungs and causing the horse to inhale. As the neck is lowered during the extended phase of the gallop, the hind legs move backward and the gut contents shift forwards, pushing into the diaphragm and forcing air out of the lungs.

== Ability to smell ==
The horse's olfactory receptors are located in the mucosa of the upper nasal cavity. Due to the length of the nasal cavity, there is a large area of these receptors, and the horse has a better ability to smell than a human. Additionally, the horse also has a vomeronasal organ, or Jacobson's Organ, which is in the hard palate, and is able to pick up pheromones and other scents when a horse exhibits the flehmen response. The flehmen response forces air through slits in the nasal cavity and into the vomeronasal organ. Unlike many other animals, the horse's Jacobson's Organ doesn't open into the oral cavity.

== Respiratory diseases ==
- Influenza
- Left Recurrent Laryngeal Hemiplegia ("Roaring")
- Recurrent airway obstruction ("Heaves"), akin to COPD or emphysema in humans.
- Strangles (Streptococcus equi infection)
- Rhinopneumonitis
- Exercise induced pulmonary hemorrhage
- Equine nasal cysts
- Ethmoid hematoma
- Nasal polyps
- Bacterial sinusitis (Empyema)
- Bacterial pleuropneumonia
- Dorsal displacement of the soft palate
- Silicosis
