= Robert Cook (veterinarian) =

British veterinarian (1930 or 1931 – 2025)

William Robert Cook (1930 or 1931 – August 25, 2025) was a British equine veterinarian. He published many papers, mainly on diseases of the horse's mouth, ear, nose and throat both in scientific and horseman's journals, covering various topics:

- equine diagnostical and surgical endoscopy
- pulmonary origin of the "nose-bleeds" in racehorses (EIPH: Exercise induced pulmonary hemorrhage) and its relation with recurrent airway obstruction
- anatomy and physiology of horse's upper airway
- guttural pouch diseases
- epiglottic entrapment
- stride and respiration
- recurrent laryngeal neuropathy (RLN)
- dorsal displacement of the soft palate
- laryngo-palatal dislocation
- headshaking syndrome and its relations with bit-related trigeminal neuralgia
- physiological incompatibilities of a bit in the mouth of a working horse
- role of the bit in the soft palate paresis at exercise and in asphyxia-induced pulmonary hemorrhage (EIPH)

== Bridle patent ==
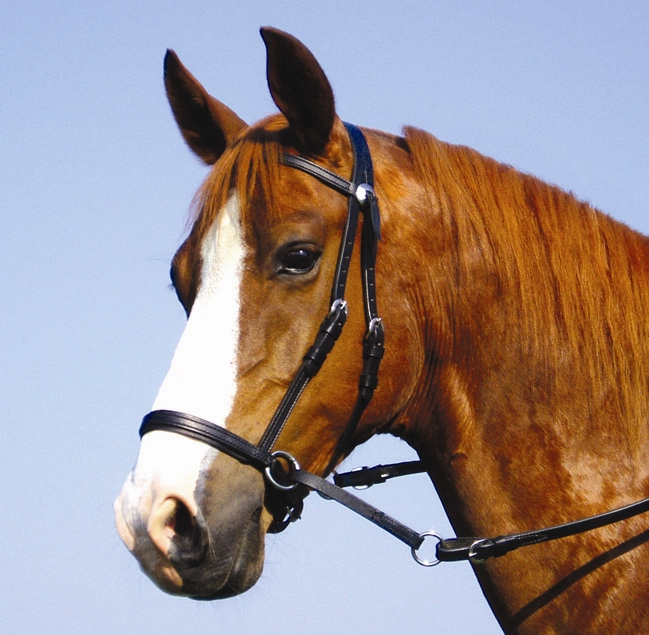
Cook's patented bridle

In 1997 Cook met Edward Allan Buck, inventor of the "original" bitless bridle in Del Mar, California. Subsequent to that meeting Cook wrote articles and many letters regarding the bitless bridle. He then took the original design created by Buck and began presenting it as his own.

From 1997, his main interest was the disadvantages and problems associated with using a bit in a horse's mouth. He proposed that the bit is the direct cause of many behavioural problems and diseases and that it exposes both the horse and the rider to serious risk. He concluded that the bit "is contraindicated, counterproductive and, in the wrong hands, potentially cruel ." He studied a new, patented type of bitless bridle and was collecting more scientific evidence about its use and related prevention of horse problems and diseases.

== Death ==
Cook died on August 25, 2025, at the age of 94.
