= L-proline amide hydrolase =

Class of enzymes

Identifiers
- EC no.: 3.5.1.101

Databases
- BRENDA: enzyme data
- ExPASy: NiceZyme view
- KEGG: enzyme entry
- MetaCyc: metabolic pathway
- Rhea: reactions
- PDB structures: RCSB PDB PDBe PDBsum
Search
- PMC: articles
- PubMed: articles
- NCBI: proteins

L-proline amide hydrolase (EC 3.5.1.101, S-stereoselective piperazine-2-tert-butylcarboxamide hydrolase, LaaA, L-amino acid amidase) is an enzyme with systematic name (S)-piperidine-2-carboxamide amidohydrolase. It catalyses several related hydrolysis reactions.

For example, prolinamide is converted to proline:

prolinamide
H_{2}O
NH_{3}
proline

The enzyme characterised from Pseudomonas azotoformans also gives (-)-pipecolic acid from (S)-piperidine-2-carboxamide:

(S)-piperidine-2-carboxamide
H_{2}O
NH_{3}
(-)-pipecolic acid

An X-ray structure of the enzyme showed it to be similar to prolyl aminopeptidase.
