= Purpura haemorrhagica =

Rare complication of equine strangles

Purpura haemorrhagica is a rare complication of equine strangles and is caused by bleeding from capillaries which results in red spots on the skin and mucous membranes together with oedema (swelling) of the limbs and the head. Purpura haemorrhagica is more common in younger animals.

== Pathophysiology ==
Horses that develop purpura haemorrhagica usually have a recent history of strangles (infection with Streptococcus equi subsp. equi) or vaccination (intramuscular or intranasal) for strangles. It is thought to be caused by an auto-immune reaction where antibodies against the S. equi M- or R-protein cross-react with proteins on endothelial cells. This results in vasculitis, leading to subsequent severe peripheral edema in the legs and ventral abdomen, as well as petechiation or ecchymoses over the mucous membranes.

Purpura haemorrhagica can also rarely be seen after infection with S. equi subsp.zooepidemicus, Rhodococcus equi, Corynebacterium pseudotuberculosis (causative agent of pigeon fever), equine influenza virus, or equine herpes virus type 1, or without any apparent infection.

== Clinical signs ==
The most common clinical signs are subcutaneous edema of the limbs and hemorrhages on mucous membranes. Other clinical signs include depression, anorexia, fever, elevated heart and respiratory rate, reluctance to move, drainage from lymph nodes, exudation of serum from the skin, colic, epistaxis and weight loss. Rarely, horses may also develop disseminated intravascular coagulation (DIC), leading to infarction of various organs, or chronic myositis and muscle atrophy.

== Treatment ==
Treatment usually involves high doses of steroids such as dexamethasone. While high doses of steroids may risk laminitis, low doses are associated with refractory cases. Antibiotics are used to treat any residual nidus of S. equi. Non-steroidal anti-inflammatory drugs (NSAIDs), such as phenylbutazone or flunixin, may be useful to reduce fever and relieve pain. Intravenous DMSO is sometimes used as a free-radical scavenger and anti-inflammatory. Additionally, wrapping the legs may reduce edema and skin sloughing. Supportive care with oral or IV fluids may also be required.

== Prognosis ==
The prognosis is good with early, aggressive treatment (92% survival in one study).

== Prevention ==
Purpura haemorrhagica may be prevented by proper management during an outbreak of strangles. This includes isolation of infected horses, disinfection of fomites, and good hygiene by caretakers. Affected horses should be isolated for at least one month following infection. Exposed horses should have their temperature taken daily and should be quarantined if it becomes elevated. Prophylactic antimicrobial treatment is not recommended.

Vaccination can reduce the incidence and severity of the disease. However, horses with high SeM antibody titers are more likely to develop purpura haemorrhagica following vaccination and so these horses should not be vaccinated. Titers may be measured by ELISA.

== See also ==
- Purpura - in humans
