= LAAA =

LAAA may refer to:

- Haiti in Action, a political party
- L-proline amide hydrolase, an enzyme
- Los Angeles Angels of Anaheim
