= Corynebacterium pseudotuberculosis =

Scientific classification
- Domain: Bacteria
- Kingdom: Bacillati
- Phylum: Actinomycetota
- Class: Actinomycetes
- Order: Mycobacteriales
- Family: Corynebacteriaceae
- Genus: Corynebacterium
- Species: C. pseudotuberculosis

Binomial name
- Corynebacterium pseudotuberculosis (Buchanan 1911) Eberson 1918 (Approved Lists 1980)

Species of bacterium

Corynebacterium pseudotuberculosis is a Gram-positive bacterium known to infect ruminants, horses, and – rarely – people. It is a facultative anaerobic organism that is catalase-positive and capable of beta-hemolysis. In small ruminants, C. pseudotuberculosis causes a disease called caseous lymphadenitis, which is characterized by pyogranulomatous abscess formation. In general, the bacterium causes lesions of the skin, lymph nodes, and internal organs. A disease known as ulcerative lymphagenitis can also result from infection with C. pseudotuberculosis in the distal limbs of horses. This bacterium uses the virulence factors phospholipase D and mycolic acid to damage eukaryotic cell walls and resist phagocytic lysosomal degradation, respectively. Infection with this bacterium is often confirmed by bacterial culture of the purulent exudate. Once the diagnosis has been made, treatment of the infection can begin, but this is difficult due to the nature of the organism and the lesions it forms. Specifically, C. pseudotuberculosis is intrinsically resistant to streptomycin, with varying resistance to penicillin and neomycin depending on the strain. It has been shown to be susceptible to ampicillin, gentamicin, tetracycline, lincomycin, and chloramphenicol. Vaccines have also been produced to develop acquired immunity to this infection.

== History, epidemiology, and zoonotic risk ==
Development of a vaccine was completed in 1983, and it was added to the recommended clostridial vaccines for sheep. The national average of prevalence in Australia was 5.2% in 2009, although this varies by region. C. pseudotuberculosis also causes disease in horses, and it should be considered prevalent in areas where cases of "pigeon fever" and "ulcerative lymphadenitis" have been recorded.

Major bacterial spread occurs when superficial abscesses break open and release discharge that comes into contact by other animals during grooming or contaminates feed, water, and bedding that other animals consume. In horses, arthropod vectors are considered a significant source of infection. As vector patterns change with warming temperatures, C. pseudotuberculosis in horses is re-emerging in the United States.

This bacterial species has caused occasional cases of infection in people who work closely with infected small ruminants, resulting in similar swellings of the lymph nodes in the neck and groin. The most likely route of infection is direct contact with the infected animal or its raw products.

== Cellular morphology, biochemistry, and identification ==
C. pseudotuberculosis is a Gram-positive bacterium that has been observed as coccoid or filamentous rods, which can be organized into palisades. Metachromatic volutin granules containing phosphate can be seen in the rod form. but not in the coccoid form when stained using Albert's or Neisser's methods. Other characteristics of this bacterium include being nonsporulating, noncapsulated, and immobile, as well as possessing fimbrae.

The bacterium is a facultative anaerobe that grows at 37 °C under aerobic or anaerobic conditions. It forms dry, pale yellow colonies measuring 1–2 mm in diameter after incubation on solid media for 48 hours. Media containing serum or whole blood improve bacterial growth, and a band of beta-hemolysis tends to forms around bacterial colonies after 48–72 hours of incubation on blood agar. C. pseudotuberculosis forms clumps in fluid media.

While strains of C. pseudotuberculosis are consistent in their morphology and growth on media, they show greater variation in biochemical properties such as fermenting ability. While they are unable to produce gas, all strains can use glucose, fructose, maltose, mannose, and sucrose to produce acid. Additional biochemical properties of this bacterium include being beta-hemolytic, positive for phospholipase D and catalase, and negative for oxidase. Generally, two subtypes of C. pseudotuberculosis are known: the equi biovar affects horses and cattle, while the ovis biovar affects small ruminants. Their ability to reduce nitrate can be used to distinguish between the subtypes. The equi biovar can reduce nitrate, while the ovis biovar generally cannot reduce nitrate, but some exceptions have been demonstrated. Coryneform bacteria, including C. pseudotuberculosis, can also be differentiated using a biochemical test called the API Coryne system, which involves enzyme and carbohydrate fermentation tests and requires 24–48 hours to perform. Finally, genetic sequence analysis can be used to confirm the identification of C. pseudotuberculosis if biochemical identification is not sufficient. A multiplex polymerase chain reaction assay has been developed using a number of characteristic genes that can differentiate between the closely related species of corynebacteria – C. pseudotuberculosis, C. ulcerans, and C. diphtheriae.

== Clinical signs ==
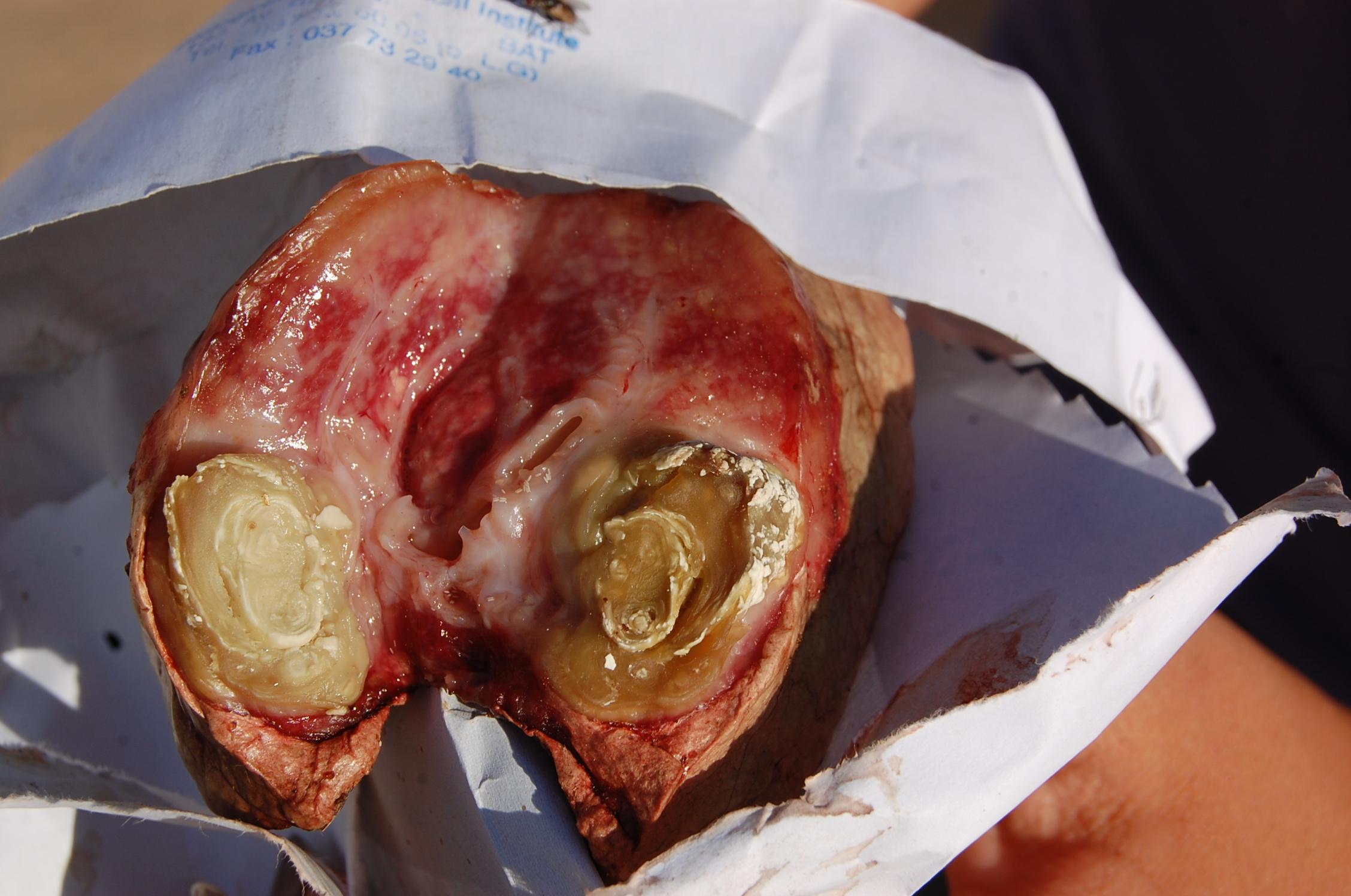
Caseous lymphadenitis - abscessed lesion in a ram

=== Disease in small ruminants ===
C. pseudotuberculosis causes a disease known as caseous lymphadenitis that most commonly affects small ruminants, such as goats and sheep. The disease often presents with pyogranulomatous abscess formation. Abscessation can occur in numerous areas, but it most commonly affects the cutaneous region and superficial lymph nodes. This is known as the external form of the disease and is the primary form affecting goats; nodular lesions are often visible. The internal form of the disease is more of a concern for sheep, in which internal organs and lymph nodes are affected. Over time, these abscesses deposit multiple layers of fibrous capsules, which gives them a lamellated appearance upon cross-section. The contents of the abscess are thick and purulent, and the abscess often ruptures.

The internal manifestation of the disease is harder to recognize, as the clinical signs are not as obvious, but may include a reduction in reproductive ability and diminished body condition. Depending on the location of the lesions, the animal may develop dysphagia and abnormal rumination.

=== Disease in cattle ===
The most common clinical sign for infected cattle is ulcerative lesions of the skin. Mastitis, an infection of the udder that is most commonly caused by species of the Streptococcus and Staphylococcus genera, may also be caused by C. pseudotuberculosis in rare circumstances. Infected cattle may also have a higher frequency of abortions.

=== Disease in horses ===
C. pseudotuberculosis can also cause disease in horses, which also present with abscessation, but the lesions are most commonly seen on the underside of the abdomenal and pectoral regions. C. pseudotuberculosis can also cause infection of the distal limbs, a manifestation known as ulcerative lymphangitis. It is usually a unilateral lesion. The affected limb is painful and swollen, containing draining ulcerative and nodular lesions.

== Diagnosis ==
Diagnosis of C. pseudotuberculosis can be difficult due to vague clinical signs such as weight loss and general ill thrift. Confirming diagnosis in animals infected with the internal form of the disease is more difficult, but ultrasonography or radiography may be useful. PCR has shown promising results for diagnosis, and a double-antibody sandwich ELISA can be used in sheep and goats.

== Pathogenicity and virulence ==
C. pseudotuberculosis has two well-documented virulence factors: phospholipase D (an endotoxin) and a mycolic acid surface lipid. Both virulence factors are proposed to be independent of plasmids, as no plasmid has been found in C. pseudotuberculosis.

=== Phospholipase D ===
Every isolate of C. pseudotuberculosis in research so far has had the phospholipase D virulence factor. Studies that examine the absence or mutation of the phospholipase D gene in C. pseudotuberculosis–infected mice have been shown to fail to develop chronic abscessation. This phospholipase encoding gene has been isolated to pathogenicity island 1. At least seven pathogenicity islands have been recorded in C. pseudotuberculosis.

Phospholipase D is an ester bond–cleaving exotoxin that provides the bacterium with the ability to cleave sphingomyelin, which is a glycerophospholipid eukaryotic cell-wall component, so by destruction or cleavage of this component, the cell wall becomes damaged. This can cause death or loss of function of eukaryotic cells. This effect may help the invasion of C. pseudotuberculosis.

Phospholipase D also increases vascular permeability, possibly due to sphingomyelinase effects. The increase in permeability may allow increased lymphatic drainage, leading to one of the mechanisms of migration to the lymph nodes, where C. pseudotuberculosis causes chronic abscessation.

=== Mycolic acid ===
Another mechanism of lymphatic transport is facilitated by the presence of a mycolic acid surface lipid that coats C. pseudotuberculosis. Mycolic acid provides a protective barrier that allows the bacterial cell to resist lysosomal degradation by phagocytic white blood cells. This allows the bacteria to act as facultative intracellular parasites once they have been phagocytized; the phagocyte eventually migrates to the lymph node, where chronic infection occurs. The surface lipid is cytotoxic and can cause death to macrophages.

In a prospective study involving 12 Boer goats, inoculation with mycolic acid compared to control animals provided statistically significant evidence of pathological changes in the lung compared to a control group. Groups inoculated with mycolic acid or C. pseudotuberculosis were evaluated through histopathology compared to a control. Both groups showed hemorrhage, congestion, oedema, inflammation, and necrosis. Organs affected by these degenerative changes included the lung, heart, kidney, and spleen, though severity varied within organs and within mycolic-only and C. pseudotuberculosis–infected groups. The importance of this virulence factor has also been highlighted where mice that have been injected with mycolic acid were shown to produce a chronic abscessation that increased with higher doses.

=== Differences in strain genomics ===
Four different strains of C. pseudotuberculosis are recognized: Cp1002, CpC231, Cp119, and CpFRC41. Comparing genes within these strains, the largest genome was found to be 2,377 genes, of which 1,851 genes were shared among all four strains. In a CpFRC41 strain isolated from a girl, a gene was found to encode for superoxide dismutase among other specific virulence factors. Superoxide dismutase is involved in evading the immune system by deactivating reactive chemicals secreted by the body that would otherwise kill the bacterial cell. When comparing strains Cp1002 and CpC231 in the sixth pathogenicity island (PiCp6), Cp1002 contained the gene pipA1, where CpC231 contained pipB. This island (6) codes for proline iminopeptidase, which is involved with removal of proline from proteins.

Through genomic evaluation, many more possible virulence factors have been found.

== Treatment ==
=== Antimicrobial therapy ===
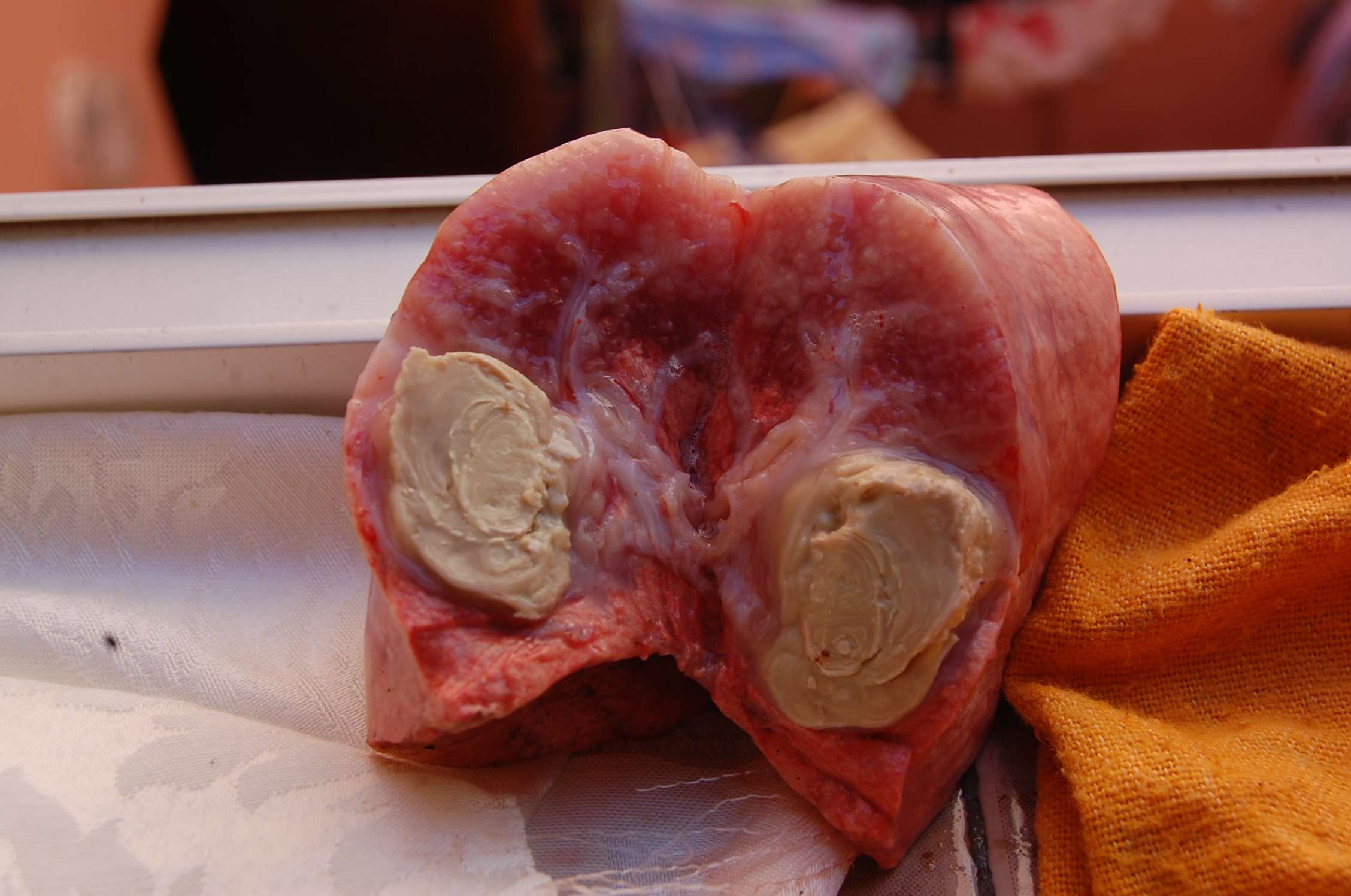
Caseous lymphadenitis lesion observed in lung tissue of a ram

Treatment of C. pseudotuberculosis in infected animals has been proven difficult, primarily due to the nature of the lesions and the facultative intracellular nature of the organism. Strains of C. pseudotuberculosis have shown to be susceptible to numerous antimicrobial therapies in vitro, including ampicillin, gentamicin, tetracycline, lincomycin, chloramphenicol, and others. Treatment within live animals (in vivo) is thought to be limited due to the firm capsule and thick, caseous nature of the abscess lesions, which make them a difficult target for antimicrobial therapy. Most strains of C. pseudotuberculosis have been shown to be intrinsically resistant to streptomycin, with varying resistance to penicillin and neomycin depending on the strain.

=== Vaccination ===
Several vaccine types are currently available for treatment of C. pseudotuberculosis infections, including bacterin, toxoid, combined, live, and DNA vaccines. Part of the C. pseudotuberculosis lifecycle being intracellular adds an additional element of difficulty to vaccine treatment, as a vaccine must be able to induce a cell-mediated response rather than a solely humoral antibody response to eliminate the bacteria from the body. A vaccine using a recombinant form of the phospholipase D exotoxin is now in widespread use, and has been shown to decrease the occurrence of lung lesions and amount of tissue damage observed upon infection. Though vaccination does not prevent infection in a flock, vaccines minimize infection severity, so vaccinations can reduce carcass condemnations for producers. This exotoxin is commonly included in combination vaccines that also protect against clostridial diseases. Good management practices that include the implementation of persistent vaccination protocols with the combination vaccine Glanvac 6 (Zoetis) have demonstrated to be effective and have led to a decrease of caseous lymphadenitis in Australia. Vaccines should be administered as directed by the manufacturer for highest efficacy, ensuring that the vaccines are given to the appropriate animals at the correct ages and are boosted at the recommended intervals.

=== Husbandry ===
With antimicrobial therapy and vaccination protocols being somewhat limited, proper management practices are highly recommended for controlling caseous lymphadenitis. Good husbandry practices can decrease the occurrence and spread of caseous lymphadenitis among small ruminants, improving animal health and minimizing economic impacts on the producers. C. pseudotuberculosis is commonly spread through superficial wounds inflicted during shearing, castration, tail docking, and ear tagging, so disinfection of equipment between animals and keeping wound sites clean can help limit spread. The disease can also spread through superficial wounds caused during animal fighting. C. pseudotuberculosis can persist on fomites such as straw bedding, hay, wood, and feces for weeks, and in the soil for up to eight months, making proper disinfection of facilities and pasture management essential to limit disease spread. Infected animals are recommended to be quarantined, and in some cases the culling of infected animals may be indicated.
