= Caseous lymphadenitis =

- Other names: Thin ewe syndrome
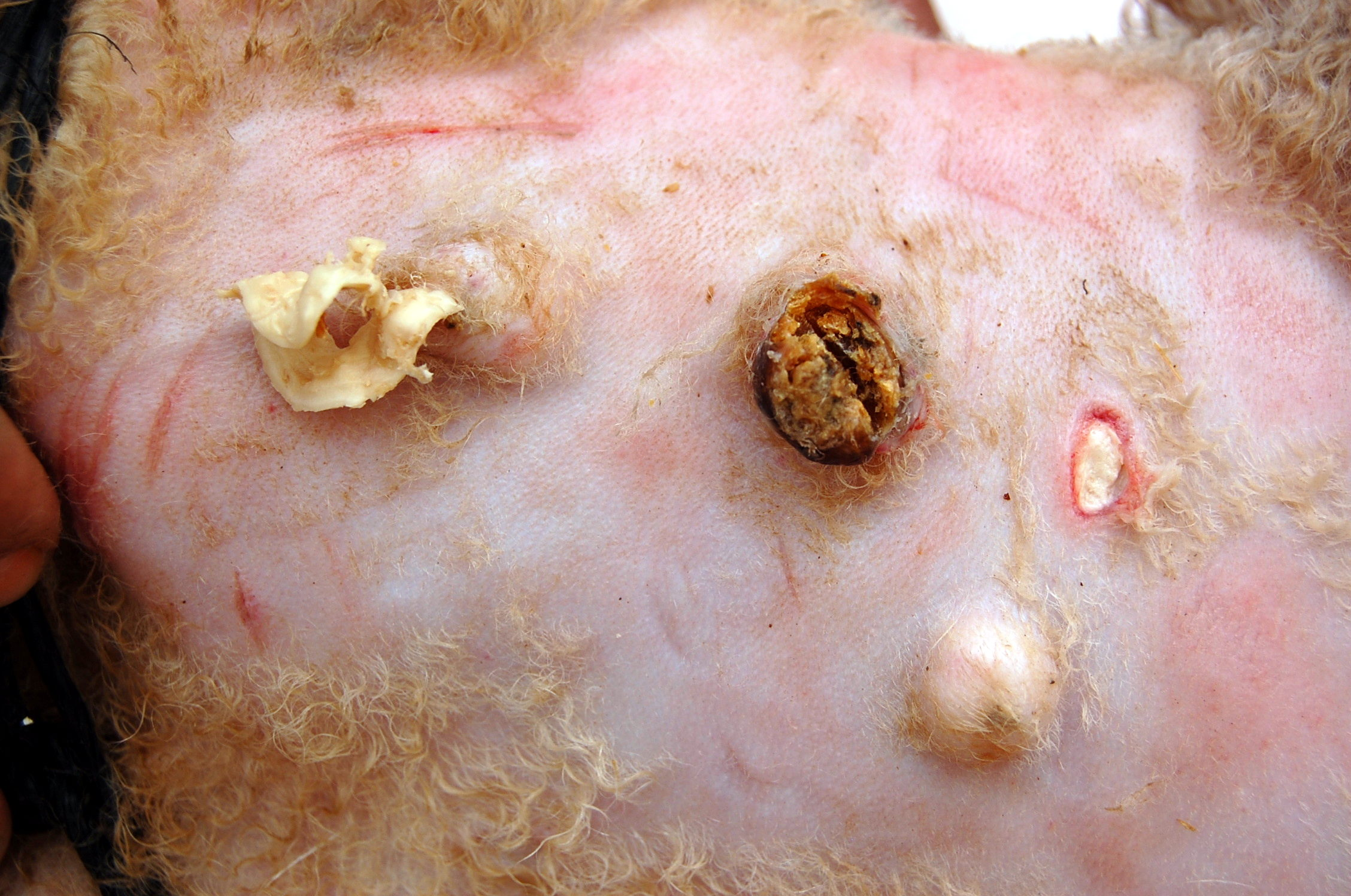
- Specialty: Veterinary medicine
- Symptoms: Pus-filled abscesses in lymph nodes and internal organs, weight loss
- Causes: Corynebacterium pseudotuberculosis
- Treatment: Drainage of abscesses, chemical cauterization, removal of external lymph nodes, antibiotics

Caseous lymphadenitis (CLA) is an infectious disease caused by the bacterium Corynebacterium pseudotuberculosis, that affects the lymphatic system, resulting in abscesses in the lymph nodes and internal organs. It is found mostly in goats and sheep and at the moment it has no cure.

== Research ==
This disease is widely distributed throughout the world. It is found in North and South America, Australia, New Zealand, Europe, Asia and Africa. Caseous lymphadenitis causes considerable economic harm, because skins and carcasses have to be condemned. It seriously affects reproduction efficiency, wool, meat and milk production. Particularly in Australia, one of the largest producers of meat and wool. Studies have found CL incidence in commercial goat herds as high as 30%.

== Cause ==
The causative organism of caseous lymphadenitis is Corynebacterium pseudotuberculosis. Once successfully established within the host, this pathogen will circumvent the immune system with ease. As a result, it causes chronic infection that may last for most or all of an animal's life, although it is seldom lethal.

== Signs ==
It manifests itself predominantly in the form of large, pus-filled cysts on the neck, sides and udders of goats and sheep. Abscesses can also develop on internal organs. An abscess can develop either at the location where the bacteria enters the body or at a nearby lymph node. The infection can spread through the blood or lymphatic system, causing abscesses to form in other lymph nodes or internal organs throughout the body. Most commonly affected organs are the liver, lungs, kidneys and lymph nodes associated these organs. Abscesses grow gradually over time, and if they are located close to the skin, rupture is common. The abscesses are reported not to be painful.

== Pathogenesis and transmission ==
The disease is highly contagious. When abscess rupture, releases it huge numbers of bacteria onto the skin and wool and it results to the consequent contamination of the surrounding environment. Neighboring animals may then be infected by the bacteria through immediate physical contact with the affected individual or indirectly via already contaminated fomites. Infected animals can contaminate the feed, water, soil, pasture and facilities. Even away from its mammalian host, the organism is well equipped for long-term survival in the environment. The disease is also easily spread through the materials that are used during the operation of the animals such as castration, identification with ear tags or by tattooing, and dehydration of abscesses. It is thought to also be spread by coughing or even by flies.

=== Diagnostics ===
Culture remains the gold standard for diagnosis in small ruminants. Synergistic hemolysis inhibition testing, as done for equine species has the ability to generate false positive results when applied to small ruminants.

=== Occurrence in other species ===
Corynebacterium pseudotuberculosis has also been isolated from occurring in other species such as deer, cattle, pigs, hedgehogs, laboratory mice, camels, horses, and humans. In only three species; sheep, goats and horses, it is recognized as a specific disease syndrome. The biotype of Corynebacterium pseudotuberculosis affecting horses and cattle is distinguishable from the biotype that infects small ruminants based on its ability to reduce nitrate in vitro. The equine and bovine strains can reduce nitrate, whereas the small ruminant strains typically do not.

== Treatment and vaccination ==
Treatment of affected animals consists of the drainage of abscesses, followed by cleansing and chemical cauterization, usually with 10% iodine, or even removal of the affected superficial lymph nodes. Also there is antibiotic therapy, which can be used as a treatment. Despite the fact that C. pseudotuberculosis is sensitive in vitro to almost all antibiotics that have been tested, antibiotic therapy is not very efficient.

The most effective way of controlling caseous lymphadenitis is still a topic of discussion. Vaccination is the primary remedy for the control of the disease in several countries, whereby immunisation reduces the spread of infection, leading to a gradual decline in incidence of the disease. However, proprietary caseous lymphadenitis vaccine is still not available, which would be a complete protection against the disease.
