= Headshaking =

Horse behaviour

Headshaking is a behaviour displayed by horses, where the horse continuously shakes its head vertically and/or horizontally. In the 1980s it was considered a bad behaviour, but instead it turned out to be a painful medical condition.

Minor head tossing is quite common in most horses as a response to insects and airborne irritants, however headshaking is a separate, severe issue. The headshaking needs veterinary attention if it occurs spontaneously with no sign of any external stimuli that may cause the motion. The behaviour is most commonly described as a vertical flicking of the head, as if an insect has flown up the animal's nostrils. Many horses also show nasal irritation and engage in rubbing or striking the muzzle off of stationary objects, such as walls and fences.

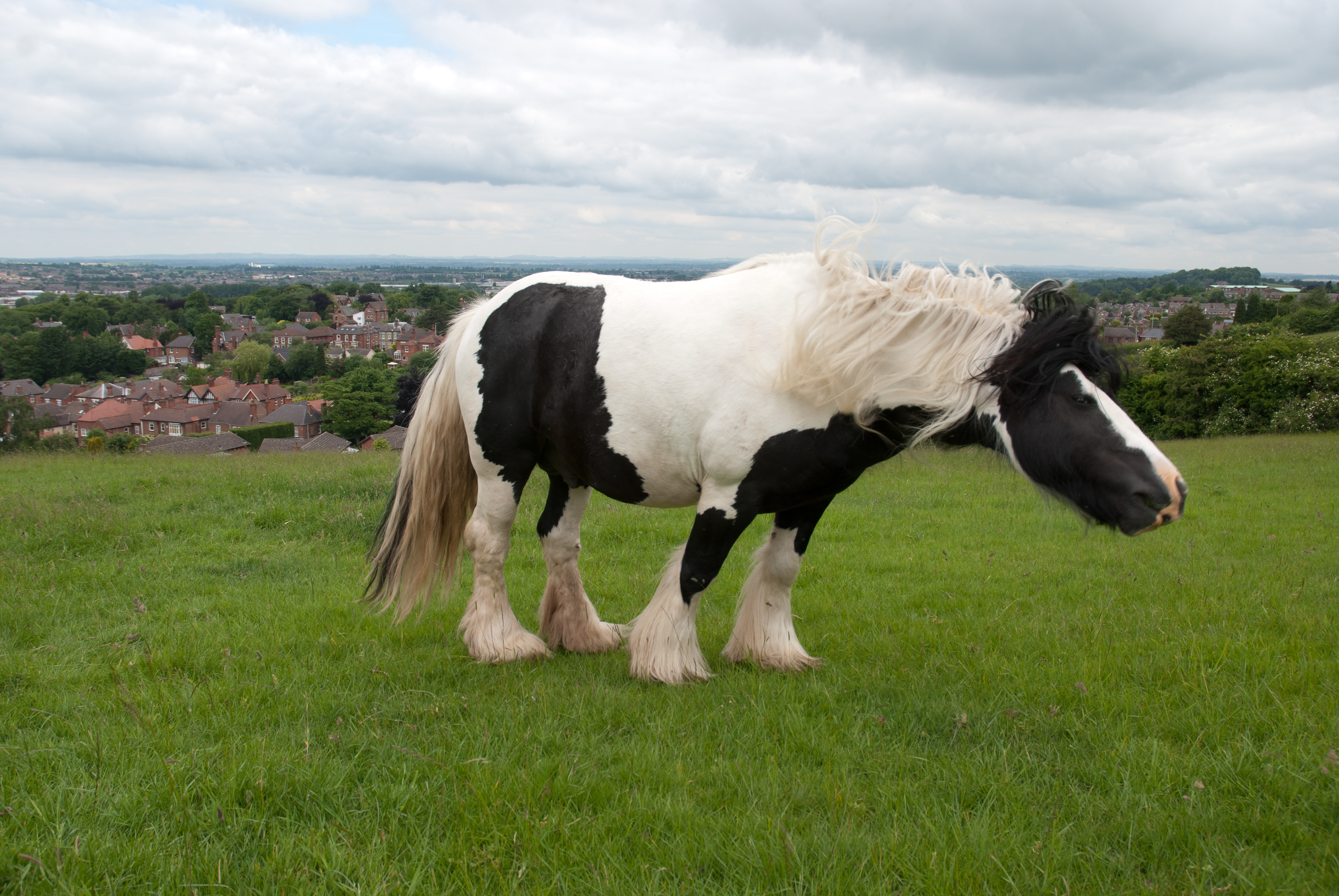
A horse displaying headshaking

The behaviour is most commonly displayed while the horse is being led, lunged, or ridden, and typically subsides while the horse is at rest. This makes riding a horse with the syndrome dangerous, as they may begin to violently toss their heads and thus, throw off the rider's balance. Because of its prevalence during exercise, many riders incorrectly attribute headshaking to a behavioural problem or to poorly fitted tack.

Although other causes have been noted, the most common cause of headshaking is the neurological disorder known as trigeminal neuralgia. It has been found that many factors, such as environment, sex, and breed, contribute to the prevalence of the behaviour. Many treatments have been proposed to help control the symptoms of the condition, but a solution to cure the behaviour has yet to be found.

== Causes ==
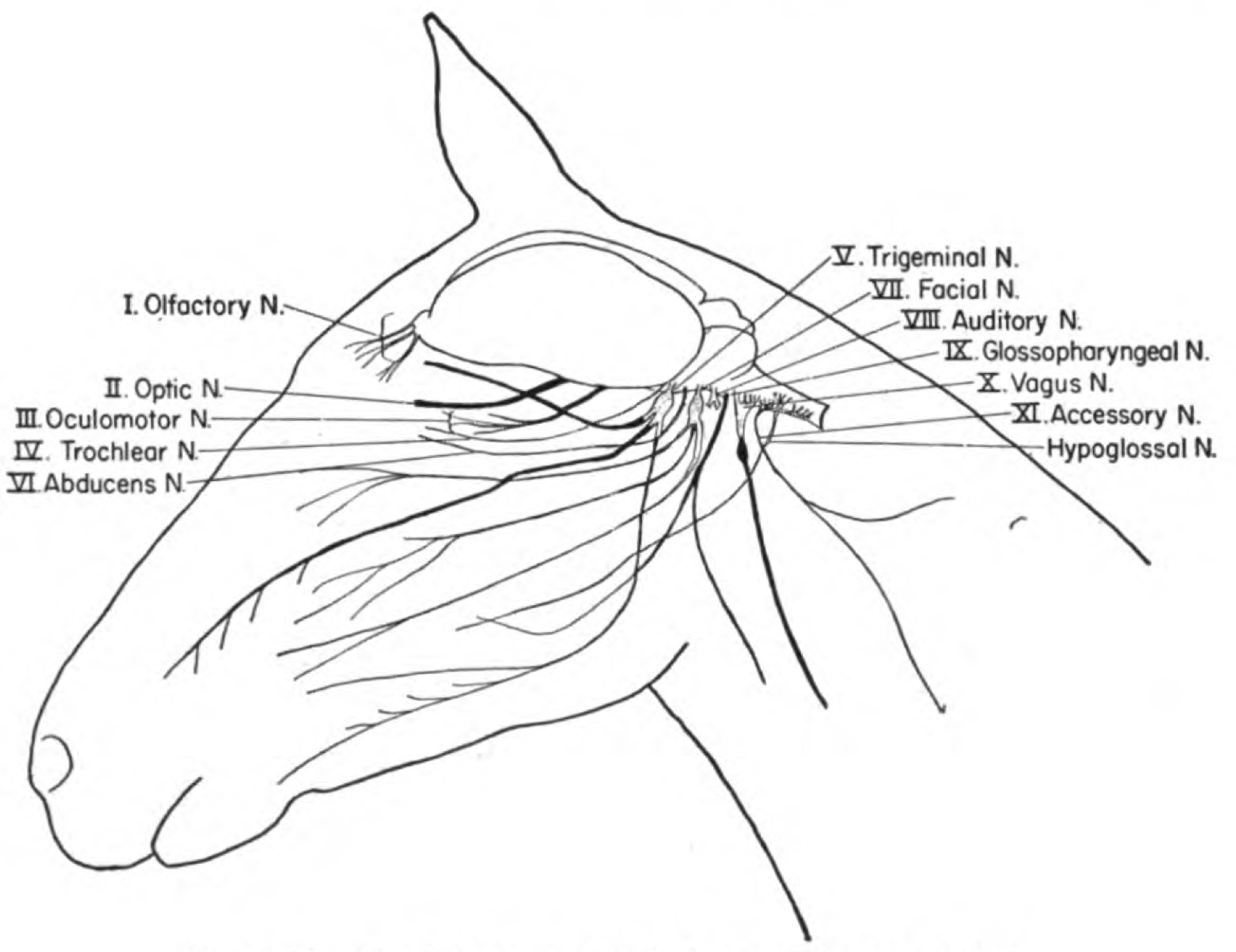
Equine facial nerves

Headshaking may be caused by a variety of medical issues, such as ear ticks or mites, dental diseases, airway abnormalities, skull trauma, sinusitis, etc. However, the most common and well-researched cause is trigeminal neuralgia, a neurological condition that affects the animal's trigeminal nerve and results in abnormal firing. The somatosensory- evoked potential was tested and is in healthy horses established at 10mA, while affected horses show a result of 5mA. Research shows that the infraorbital nerve branch of affected horses is sensitized and has an increased threshold compared with unaffected horses. The branch, therefore, has a lower firing threshold and can be triggered by various, even minor stimuli. But some seasonally affected horses seemed to have a normal threshold, when tested out of season. If the clinical symptoms are in fact connected to the threshold of the nerve, it holds the possibility of a reversible condition.

The maxillary branch of the trigeminal nerve plays a major role in facial sensation, thus causing the horse to feel intense pain in the face and muzzle area. It was distinguished that there is no difference in the involvement of the left or right branch from the trigeminal nerve. The horse's pain is expressed in its obsessive headshaking and evasive behaviour. The condition is known as "trigeminal-mediated headshaking" or "facial pain syndrome".

Potential non-neurological causes of headshaking
Oral cavity disorders	Eye disorders	Ear disorders	Airway disorders	Skull disorders	Cervical pain	Other
Dental disorders	Vision abnormalities	Otitis	Rhinitis	Fractures or trauma	Osteoarthritis	Avoidance behaviour
Buccal ulceration	Cysts, masses, cataracts	Ear mites or ticks	Guttural pouch disease	Temporomandibular joint disorders	Neuropathy	Stereotypy behaviour
Pharyngeal lesions	Nasolacrimal duct disorders	Masses, abscesses, granuloma	Laryngeal disorders	Hyoid apparatus disorders	Myositis	Ill-fitting tack
Tongue lesions			Sinusitis			Rider behaviour

== Diagnostic ==
The veterinarian has to observe the horse during exercise, at rest and under the influence of different environments and possible triggers. It sometimes can be helpful to have video materials of the owner and observe the horse on different days, to distinguish certain triggers.

After the inspection, the horse has to be examined for other causes of the headshaking not related to the trigeminal- nerve.

Additional diagnostics should be considered as well. These include:

- MRI
- X-Rays
- CT
- Endoscopy

Even though there can be a variety of different causes, 98% of the affected horses in need of veterinary care turned out to have no connection to external causes, leading to a connection to the trigeminal-nerve.

== Influences on prevalence ==
=== Environmental triggers ===
Research has shown that trigeminal-mediated headshaking may be triggered by various external factors, such as temperature, season, time of day, wind, light, and many others. Approximately 1.4% of horses are affected by headshaking and of those with the condition, 64% are affected seasonally. Light availability seems to play the biggest role in triggering the behaviour. Affected horses tend to experience more symptoms when outdoors on sunny days. Therefore, headshaking occurs most often during the spring and summer months when sunlight is more prevalent. This side of the syndrome is termed "photic headshaking" and is thought to occur due to the close proximity of the optic and trigeminal nerves. The symptoms of photic headshakers lessen when indoors and during the nighttime.

Headshaking appears to occur in horses all over the globe, but variations in the symptoms can be based on region. In the USA, 91% of affected horses were found to experience increased headshaking during the spring and early summer. While in the UK, only 39% of affected horses displayed worsened symptoms during only the spring and summer months, with more horses being affected during the spring, summer and fall.

Other individuals have been found to be triggered by the wind conditions, rain conditions, and the presence of loud sounds, although the reasoning behind these influences are currently unknown.

=== Age and sex ===
Headshaking seems to be an acquired condition that develops during the prime of the horse's life. It affects a wide age range, but the majority of horses develop the behaviour after reaching maturity, usually between 6-10 years old. A larger percentage of geldings appear to be affected by the condition when compared to mares and stallions. In some studies, as high as 90% of headshakers were found to be geldings. It is thought that geldings may be more susceptible to headshaking, as they do not have testosterone feedback, therefore during the spring when horses typically mate, the gelding's gonadotropins will be incredibly heightened. The gonadotropins alter the sensitivity of the trigeminal nerve, making it unstable and more susceptible to stimuli.

=== Exercise ===
Exercise can also influence the intensity of headshaking behaviour. Intense or more frequent exercise provides more stimulation to the brain causing increased firing of the trigeminal nerve. The increased airflow over the muzzle and nostrils while riding or lunging may also play a factor.

=== Breed and discipline ===
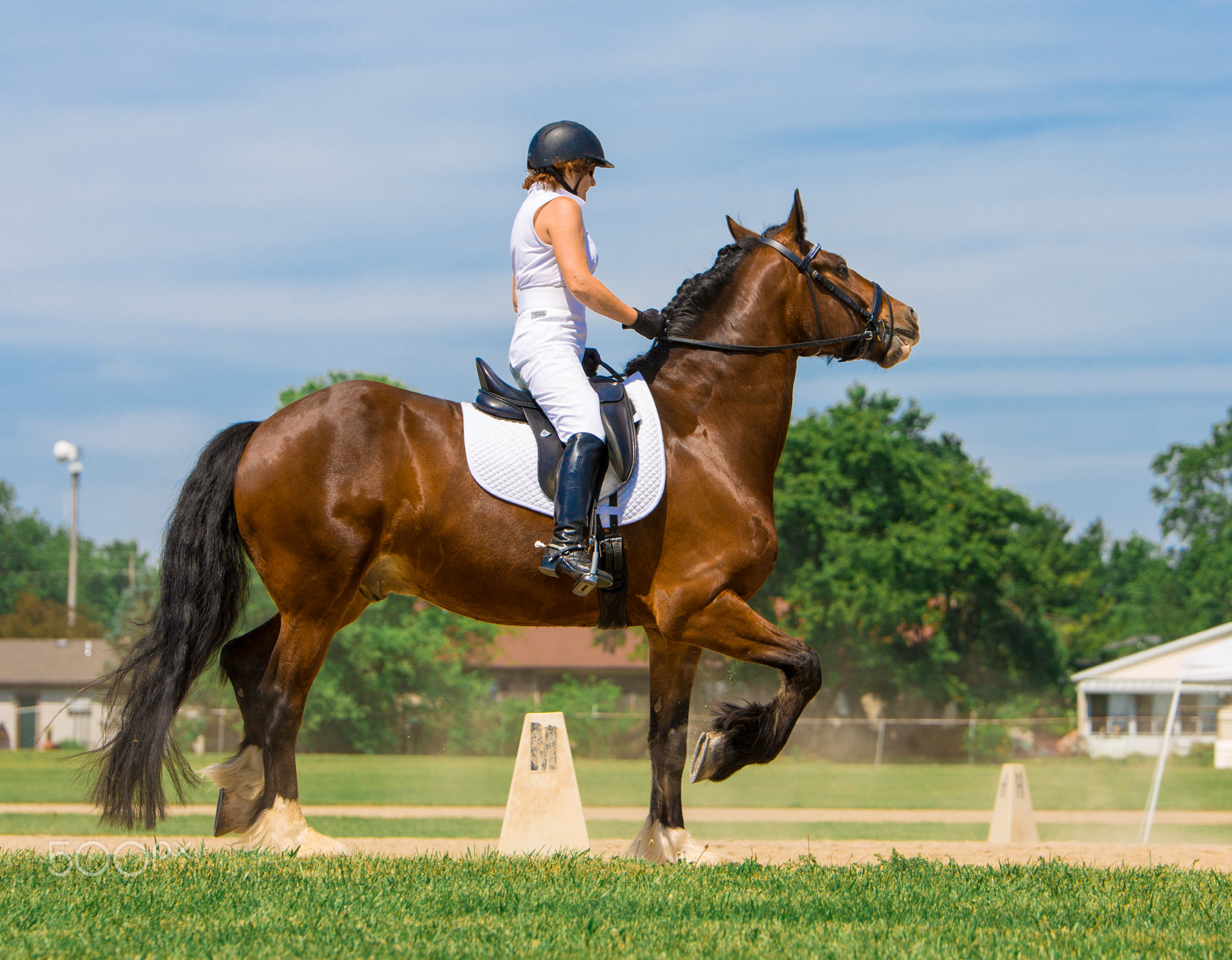
A horse and rider performing dressage

Headshaking has been observed in a wide variety of horses and is thought to be able to occur in any breed. Some studies show that the behaviour is more common in Thoroughbreds and Warmbloods, however this point is refuted by other researchers who argue that headshaking is equally likely to be seen in any breed.

When it comes to discipline, headshaking horses are typically found to be pleasure riding or general all-purpose riding horses. Other disciplines that restrict the movement of the horse, such as dressage or eventing, also tend to have more cases of headshaking. Intense, high activity disciplines like racing and showjumping, show a decreased amount of affected horses.

== Impact ==
Headshaking is a condition which impacts the life and the welfare of affected horses. Since the behaviour is caused by facial pain, the horse may be in constant discomfort. The intensity of the behaviour can range and therefore, some horses may experience greater pain than others. Various scales have been created and used to rank the intensity of headshaking behaviour.

Roberts headshaking behaviour grading system
Scale	Description
0	No headshaking behaviour
1	Mild headshaking behaviour, insufficient enough to not interfere with riding
2	Headshaking behaviour severe enough to make riding dangerous or impossible
3	Headshaking behaviour occurs even at rest

Humans who suffer from neuropathic facial pain describe their symptoms as anything varying from tingling sensations to feelings similar to intense electric shocks. Translational research may be possible to infer similarities in pain between affected humans and horses. It is thought that the horses feel sensations of tingling, itching, burning and electric-like shocks. They attempt to alleviate this pain by throwing and tossing their heads, as well as rubbing the nose, snorting and sneezing. This behaviour can cause the horse to become dangerous to ride, or even handle on a daily basis. The condition can also become an economic burden on the owner, as depending on the method, the treatment may be costly to keep up with.

== Treatment ==
Various treatment methods have been proposed to lessen the effects of headshaking, however, the behaviour has yet to completely cured. The success of a technique may vary depending on the horse's particular characteristics.

=== Nose nets ===
Nose nets may cover the horse's entire muzzle (nostrils and lips) or only the nostrils. The net prevents irritants from entering the nostrils, decreases the amount of stimuli affecting the horse's muzzle area and may provide a constant counter-stimulation to the nerves of the face. This method is noninvasive, cheap and is also permitted to be worn in most equestrian competitions. It is one of the most successful treatment methods, although it does not eradicate the problem completely. Approximately 70% of owners who attempted this method reported at least somewhat of an improvement in the symptoms of their horse. It appears to be more effective if used immediately after diagnosis, as older horses who have lived with the condition for longer, were found to be less likely to show any improvement.

=== Face masks ===
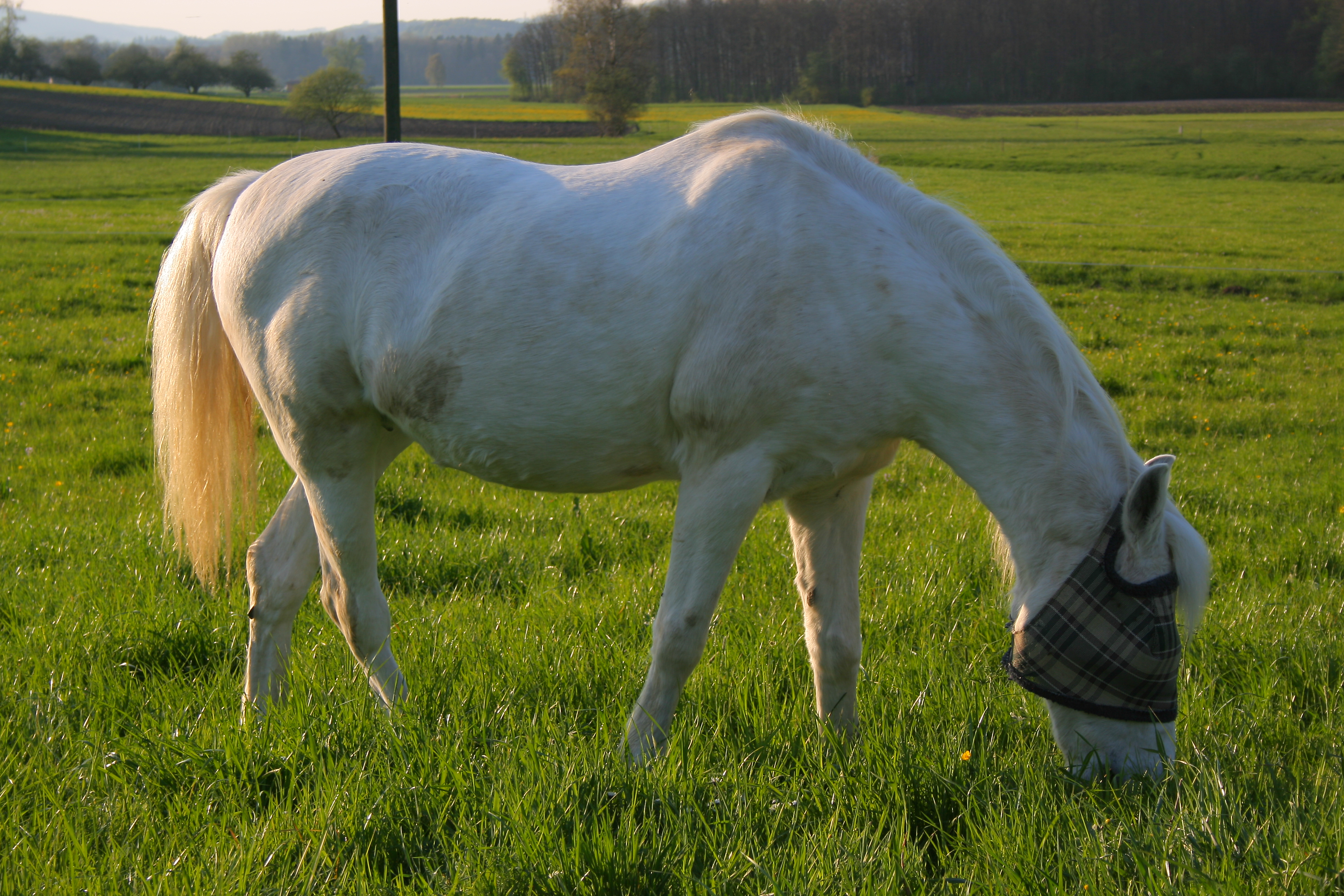
A horse wearing a face mask

Face masks can be successful in reducing the symptoms of photic headshakers. Usually the mask contains ultraviolet shades to block out any sunlight. This method works to reduce the stimulation affecting the ophthalmic branch, thus reducing the stimulation of the trigeminal nerve.

=== Eye drops ===
Sodium cromoglycate eye drops are used to stabilize mast cell membranes and has been effective in a limited number of seasonally affected horses. It is thought that eye drops may only work as a treatment for horses who experience headshaking as a result of environmental allergies.

=== Surgery ===
Infraorbital neurectomy, in which the trigeminal nerve is cut or blocked, has been used to attempt to treat headshaking. This method is not used anymore, as the rate of success was quite low and the surgery had serious side-effects on the horse. More recently, compression of the caudal infraorbital nerve via platinum coils has been attempted as a last option treatment, although the rate of success is only 50% and the chance of injury post-surgery is quite high.

=== Medication ===
A wide variety of pharmaceuticals have been used in trials attempting to reduce headshaking in horses. Many may have adverse side-effects and may also be banned from use in show horses. Cyproheptadine is an antihistamine and serotonin antagonist which has been effective in significantly reducing headshaking symptoms in many horses. It can be used alone or in conjunction with carbamazepine, an anticonvulsant used to treat nerve pain in humans. Other past and presently used forms of medication include: Gabapentin, dexamethasone, fluphenazine, and phenobarbitone.

=== Supplements ===
Magnesium supplemented into the diet of affected horses has shown some successful reduction of headshaking behaviour, especially when combined with boron. It is thought that magnesium may have calming effects on the over-sensitive nature of the trigeminal nerve. However, magnesium supplementation can be dangerous, as high doses need to be used to create an effect. Melatonin has also been used as a treatment for horses suffering from photic headshaking. It works to alter the horse's internal clock and shows the best results when administered at the same time every night, so that its effects will kick in during the day. Many researchers argue that the effects of feed supplements are mere placebo effects and do not actually help with the symptoms of the condition.

Percutaneous electrical Nervous stimulation (PENS) is used as a treatment for human patients with trigeminal facial nerve pain. It was tested on horses recently and could turn out to be a working treatment, more research on this method is necessary.
