= Pigeon fever =

Bacterial disease of horses

Pigeon fever is a disease of horses, also known as dryland distemper or equine distemper, caused by the Gram-positive bacterium Corynebacterium pseudotuberculosis biovar equi. Infected horses commonly have swelling in the chest area, making it look similar to a "pigeon chest". This disease is common in dry areas. Pigeon fever is sometimes confused with strangles, another infection that causes abscesses.

== Symptoms ==
Three common forms of pigeon fever affect horses – ulcerative lymphangitis, external abscess, and internal infection. The severity of symptoms varies depending on various factors such as age, immune system health, and nutrition. The bacteria have an incubation period of 3–4 weeks.

=== Ulcerative lymphangitis ===
Ulcerative lymphangitis is the least common form of pigeon fever seen in horses. It is characterized by severe limb swelling and cellulitis in one or both hind limbs, and can lead to lameness, fever, lethargy, and loss of appetite. Antimicrobial and anti-inflammatory treatments are required to prevent further complications, such as limb edema, prolonged or recurrent infection, lameness, weakness, and weight loss.

=== External abscess ===
External abscesses are the most common form in horses. Abscesses develop on the body, usually in the pectoral region and along the ventral midline of the abdomen. Abscesses can also develop on other areas of the body, such as the prepuce, mammary gland, triceps, limbs, and head. The fatality rate for this form infection is very low. The abscess is often drained once it has matured.

=== Internal infection ===
Only 8% of infected horses have this form of pigeon fever, but it has a 30–40% fatality rate. Organs that are commonly affected are the liver, spleen, and lungs. For a successful recovery, long-term antimicrobial therapy is essential.

== Treatment ==
Treatment depends on many factors, such as the age of horse, severity of symptoms, and duration of infection. As long a horse is eating and drinking, the infection must run its course, much like a common cold virus. Over time, a horse builds up enough antibodies to overtake and fight the disease. Other treatment options can be applying heat packs to abscesses to help draw infection to the surface and using drawing salves such as Ichthammol. A blood test or bacterial cultures can be taken to confirm the horse is fighting pigeon fever. Anti-inflammatory drugs such as phenylbutazone can be used to ease pain and help control swelling. Treating pigeon fever with antibiotics is not normally recommended for external abscesses, since it is a strong bacterium that takes extended treatment to kill off and to ensure it does not return stronger. However, if the abscesses are internal, then antibiotics may be needed. Consulting a veterinarian for treatment is recommended. Making the horse comfortable, ensuring the horse has good food supply and quality hay helps the horse keep its immune system strong to fight off the infection. Once the abscess breaks or pops, it may drain for a week or two. During this time, keeping the area clean, applying hot packs, or drawing salves can help remove the pus that has gathered in the abscess.

== Transmission ==
This bacterium is present in soil and is transmitted to horses through open wounds, abrasions, or mucous membranes.

== Prevention ==
Reducing environmental contamination is necessary to prevent the spread of insects or fomites. Owners should regularly apply insect repellent and routinely check their horses for open wounds to reduce the chance of infection. A regular manure-management program is recommended, including removal of soiled feed and bedding, as the bacteria can survive in hay and shavings for up to 2 months. Since the disease lives in the ground and is spread by flies, pest control is a good defense, but not a guarantee. Horses being introduced to new environments should be quarantined, and any infected horses should be isolated to prevent spread of the bacteria. Currently, no vaccination for pigeon fever has been developed.

== Epidemiology ==
The disease can occur in horses of any age, breed, or gender. In the US, it occurs throughout the country and at any time of year. The disease was traditionally thought to occur mainly in dry, arid regions, but from at least 2005, its range has been increasing into areas where it was not previously seen, such as the Midwestern US, and Western Canada. Environmental risk factors include over 7 days of a weekly average land surface temperatures above 35°C, and drier soils; these factors were implicated in an outbreak in Kansas in 2012.
