= Strangles =

Contagious upper respiratory tract infection of equines

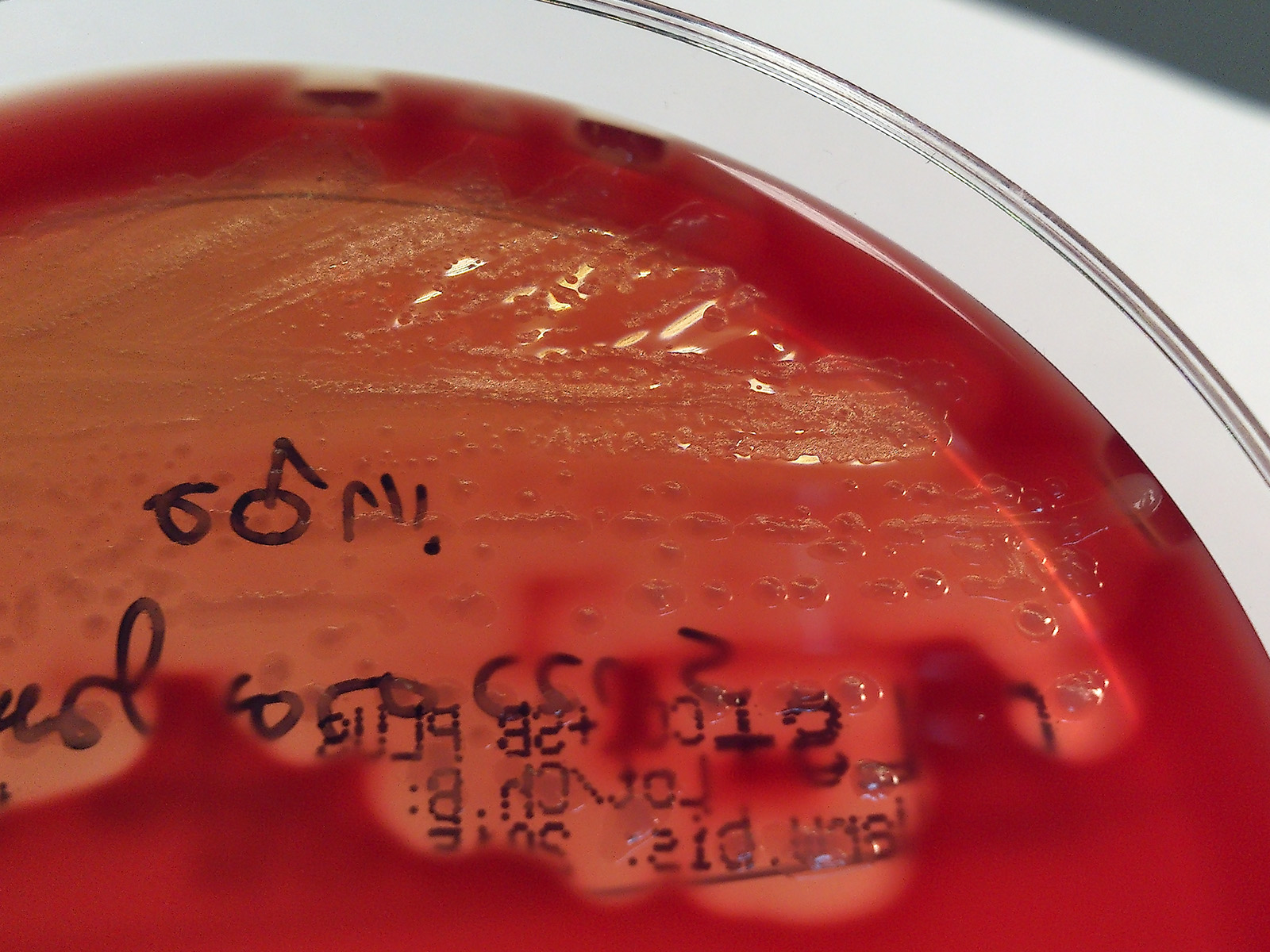
Colonies of Streptococcus equi on a blood agar plate

Strangles (also called equine distemper) is a contagious upper respiratory tract infection of horses and other equines caused by a Gram-positive bacterium, Streptococcus equi. As a result, the lymph nodes swell, compressing the pharynx, larynx, and trachea, and can cause airway obstruction leading to death, hence the name strangles. Strangles is enzootic in domesticated horses worldwide. The contagious nature of the infection has at times led to limitations on sporting events.

== Signs ==
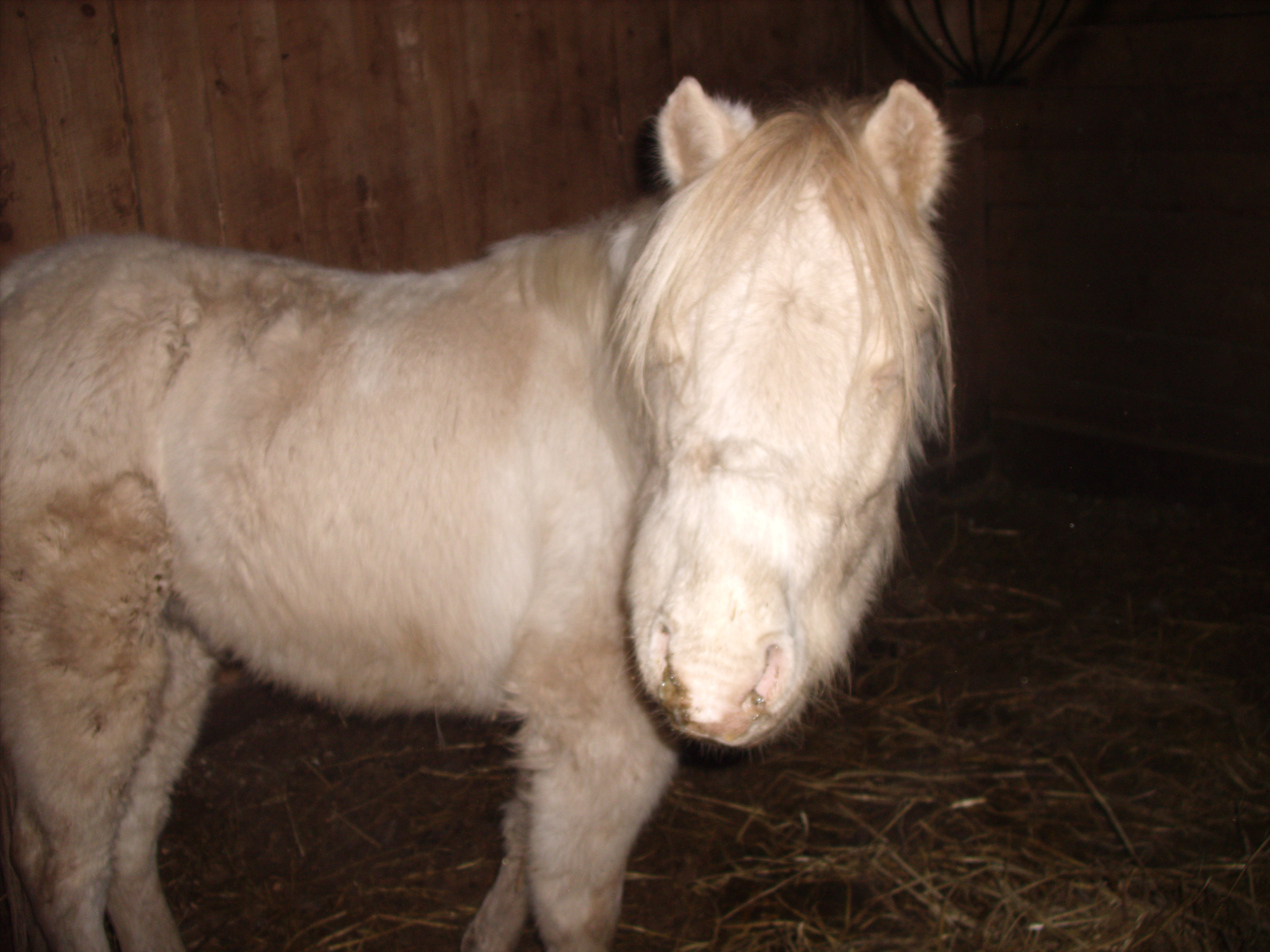
Two-year-old pony with week-old case of untreated strangles

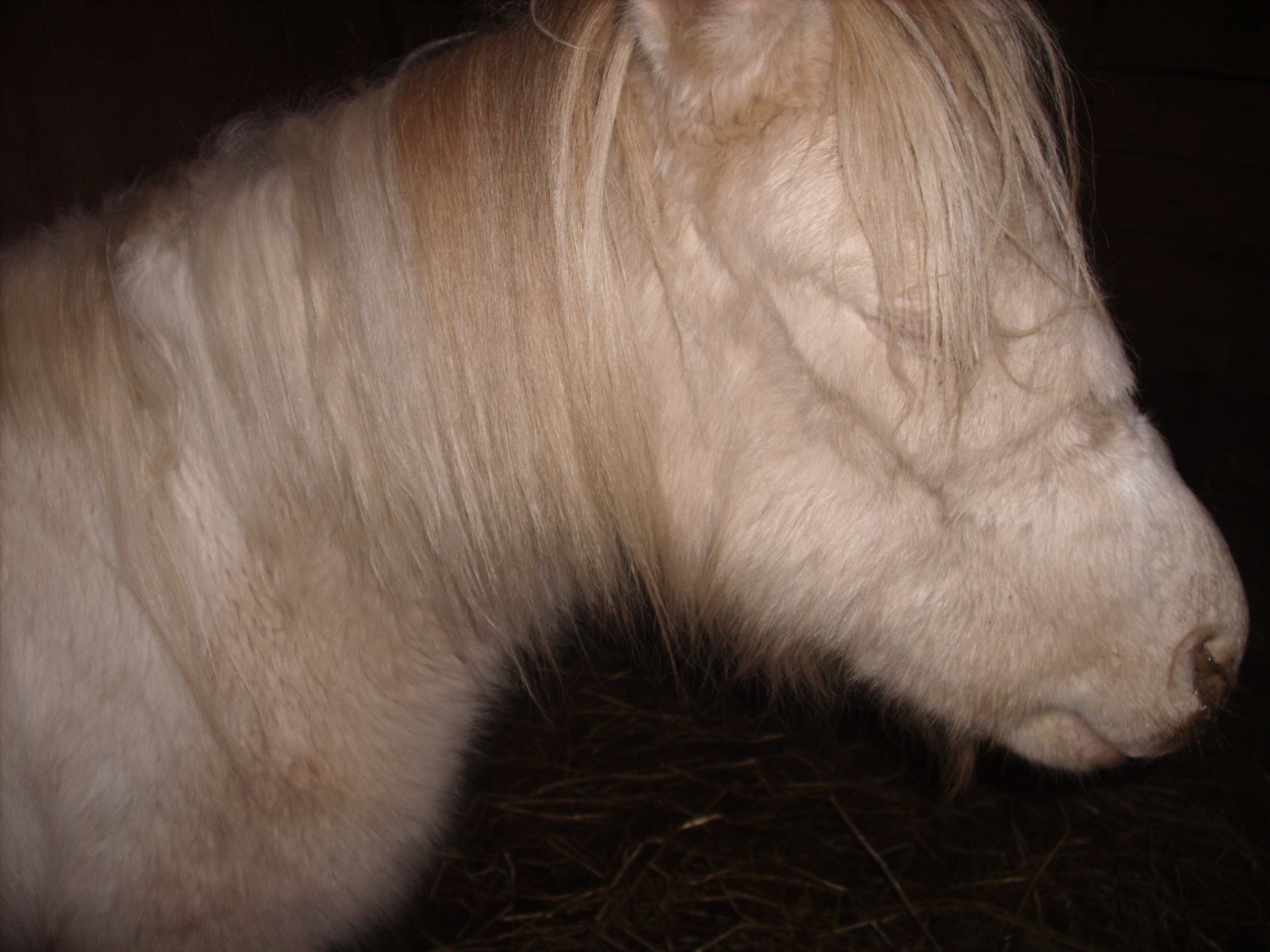
The swelling goes all the way down to the mouth

A horse with strangles typically develops abscesses in the lymph nodes of the head and neck, causing coughing fits and difficulty swallowing. Clinical signs include fever up to 106 °F (41 °C) and yellow-coloured nasal discharge from both the nose and eyes.

Abscesses may form in other areas of the body, such as the abdomen, lungs, and brain. This is considered a chronic form of strangles called "bastard strangles", which can have serious implications if the abscesses rupture. Horses develop this form of strangles when their immune systems are compromised or if the bacteria rapidly invade the body.

=== Complications ===
Possible complications include the horse becoming a chronic carrier of the disease, asphyxia due to enlarged lymph nodes compressing the larynx or windpipe, bastard strangles (spreading to other areas of the body), pneumonia, guttural pouch filled with pus, abscesses, purpura haemorrhagica, and heart disease. The average course of this disease is 23 days.

== Cause ==
The disease is spread by an infected horse when nasal discharge or pus from the draining lymph nodes contaminate pastures, feed troughs, brushes, bedding, tack, etc.

== Prevention ==
Both intramuscular and intranasal vaccines are available, although their efficacy is rated at no more than 50%. Isolation of new horses for four to six weeks, immediate isolation of infected horses, and disinfection of stalls, water buckets, feed troughs, and other equipment can help prevent the spread of strangles. As with any contagious disease, hand washing is a simple and effective tool.

== Treatment ==
As with many streptococcal infections, beta-lactam antibiotics (e.g penicillins) are the most effective treatments, but some authorities are of the opinion that use of antibiotics is contraindicated once abscesses have begun to form, as they predispose to lymphatic spread of the infection (bastard strangles), which has a much higher mortality rate.

After an abscess has burst, keeping the wound clean is important. A diluted povidone-iodine solution has been used with good results to disinfect the open hole, flushing the inside with a syringe-tipped catheter or with a teat cannula, followed by gentle scrubbing to keep the surrounding area clean.

Symptomatic therapy is an alternative treatment, and is where warm packs are used to mature the abscesses so making them less painful and more comfortable for the horse, but once the abscesses have been matured, they must be kept clean to prevent further infections. This treatment for S. equi only helps reduce pain for the horse rather than curing the infection.

== Outcomes ==
Strangles has an 8.1% mortality rate. Mortality is lower in cases without complications than it is in cases of bastard strangles. The disease is very contagious and morbidity is high. Precautions to limit the spread of the illness are necessary and those affected are normally isolated. An isolation period of 4–6 weeks is usually necessary to ensure that the disease is not still incubating before ending the quarantine.

== Epidemiology ==
Equines of any age may contract the disease, although younger and elderly equines are more susceptible. Young equines may lack immunity to the disease because they have not had prior exposure. Geriatric equines may have a weaker immune system.

== See also ==
- Pigeon fever
