= Equine nasal cysts =

Disorder of the nose of horses

Equine nasal cysts are abnormal fluid filled sacs which occur inside the nasal sinuses of horses. The cysts are lined with epithelium, and usually occur in the ventral conchae or maxillary sinuses, most commonly in horses less than one year old. Surgical removal of the cyst has a good prognosis for the horse.

== Characteristics ==
The most common sign of a nasal cyst is facial swelling, with obstruction of the nasal passage. Sometimes, a mucoid nasal discharge occurs, which is caused by obstruction to mucociliary clearance, and therefore does not resolve following antibiotic treatment. If the cyst is located in the caudal maxillary sinus, it may cause the eyeball on the affected side to bulge out of the orbit, known as exophthalmos.

== Diagnosis ==
Radiographs generally provide better results than endoscopic examination when diagnosing these problems; multiloculated densities and fluid lines show up more readily in the sinuses, occasionally with dental displacement and also dental and jaw line distortion, flattened roots in the teeth, mineralization and soft tissue calcification, and major deviation of the septum and vomer bones.

== Treatment ==
Cysts are removed by surgery, which may be performed with the horse standing and sedated, or under general anesthesia. Treatment involves surgical removal of the cyst and any of the involved lining of the concha.

== Prognosis ==
The prognosis for a complete recovery is good, and the rate of any recurrence is minimal. Some horses may have a mild mucous discharge after surgery, which can be permanent.

== Epidemiology ==
Most nasal cysts are identified in horses younger than one year old, but can also be diagnosed in horses over 9 years of age. There is no known breed or sex predisposition for nasal cysts.

== See also ==
Ethmoid hematoma
