= Pseudomonas azotoformans =

Scientific classification
- Domain: Bacteria
- Kingdom: Pseudomonadati
- Phylum: Pseudomonadota
- Class: Gammaproteobacteria
- Order: Pseudomonadales
- Family: Pseudomonadaceae
- Genus: Pseudomonas
- Species: P. azotoformans

Binomial name
- Pseudomonas azotoformans Iizuka and Komagata 1963

Type strain
- CCUG 12536 CIP 106744; IAM 1603; JCM 2777; NBRC 12693

Species of bacterium

Pseudomonas azotoformans is a Gram-negative bacterium that infects cereal grains—especially rice. Based on 16S rRNA analysis, P. azotoformans has been placed in the P. fluorescens group. The bateria's biofilm gives it a significant protection against organic peroxyacids.
