= Ethmoid hematoma =

Veterinary condition in horses

Ethmoid hematoma is a progressive and locally destructive disease of horses. It is indicated by a mass in the paranasal sinuses that resembles a tumor, but is not neoplastic by any means. The origins and causes of the ethmoid hematoma are generally unknown. Large hematomas usually start within the ethmoid labyrinth, and smaller ones tend to begin on the sinus floor.

The hematoma usually extends into the nasal passage. A growing hematoma causes pressure necrosis of the bone surrounding the hematoma, but only on rare occasions does it cause facial distortion. It is most commonly seen in horses older than six years. Mild, persistent, spontaneous, intermittent, and unilateral epistaxis is the most common sign clinically.

== Diagnosis ==
Diagnosis of the condition is best suited to endoscopy; the lesion can be seen extending into the nasal passages on endoscopic examination and can be demonstrated on radiographs. Further elucidation can be obtained with MRI or CT in cases which are more widespread or invasive.

== Treatment ==
Treatment most commonly involves the removal of the complete lesion during a single procedure, via the frontonasal bone flaps; recurrence is likely. Ablation treatment with an Nd:YAG laser looks to be a possibility for permanent removal.

Some success has been seen using intralesional injections of formalin, performed by endoscopy.

== Prognosis ==
Prognosis for this condition varies according to extent of the hematoma, but is normally fairly good. Smaller hematomas carry a 99% chance of full recovery, with larger ones carrying a recovery rate ranging from 80 to 90%. Occasional epistaxis may follow the surgery, but this is temporary and should subside within 2 to 3 weeks after surgery.

== See also ==
- Equine nasal cysts
