= Prolyl aminopeptidase =

Class of enzymes

Identifiers
- EC no.: 3.4.11.5
- CAS no.: 9025-40-5

Databases
- IntEnz: IntEnz view
- BRENDA: BRENDA entry
- ExPASy: NiceZyme view
- KEGG: KEGG entry
- MetaCyc: metabolic pathway
- PRIAM: profile
- PDB structures: RCSB PDB PDBe PDBsum
Search
- PMC: articles
- PubMed: articles
- NCBI: proteins

Prolyl aminopeptidase (EC 3.4.11.5, proline aminopeptidase, Pro-X aminopeptidase, cytosol aminopeptidase V, proline iminopeptidase) is an enzyme. This enzyme catalyses the following chemical reaction

Release of N-terminal proline from a peptide

This enzyme requires Mn^{2+} ion to function.
