= Guttural pouch =

Anatomical feature in some animals

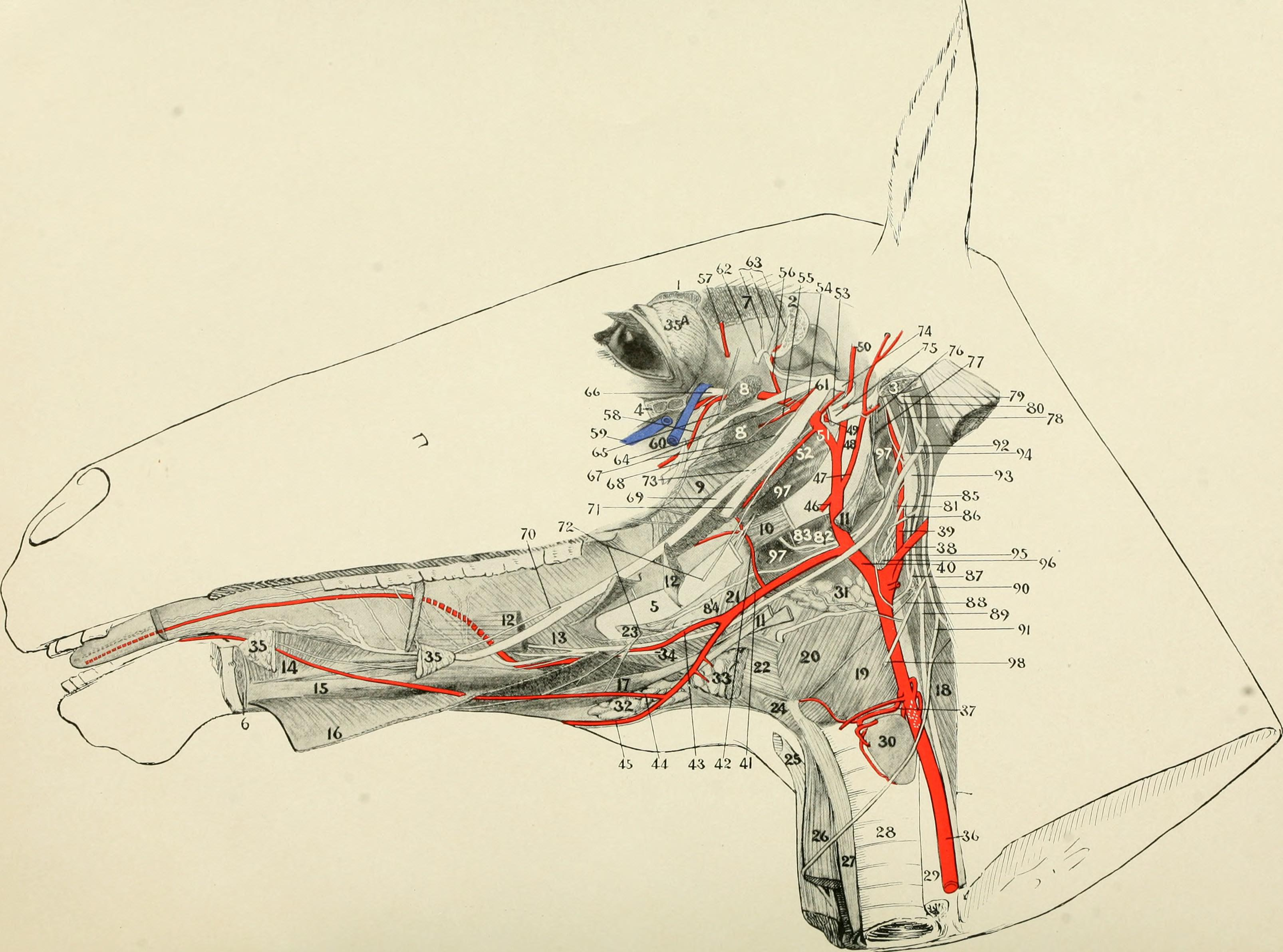
Guttural pouch (labelled 97)

Guttural pouches are large, auditory-tube diverticula that contain between 300 and 600 ml of air. They are present in odd-toed mammals, some bats, hyraxes, and the American forest mouse. They are paired bilaterally just below the ears, behind the skull and connect to the nasopharynx.

Due to the general inaccessibility of the pouches in horses, they can be an area of infection by fungi and bacteria, and these infections can be extremely severe and hard to treat. The condition guttural pouch tympany affects several breeds, including the Arabian horse. The condition predisposes young horses to infection, often including severe swelling and often requires surgery to correct. The guttural pouch is also the site of infection in equine strangles.

== Structure ==
The guttural pouches are located behind the cranial cavity, caudally the skull and below the wings of the atlas (C1). They are enclosed by the parotid and mandibular salivary glands, and the pterygoid muscles. The ventral portion lies on the pharynx and beginning of the esophagus, with the retropharyngeal lymph nodes located between the ventral wall and pharynx. The left and right pouches are separated by the longus capitis and rectus capitis ventralis muscles dorsomedially. Below these muscles, the two pouches fuse to form a median septum.

The guttural pouches connect the middle ear to the pharynx. The opening into the pharynx is called the nasopharyngeal ostium, which is composed of the pharyngeal wall laterally and a fibrocartilaginous fold medially. This opening leads to a short soft tissue passageway into the respective guttural pouch. The openings are located rostrally to enable drainage of mucus when the head is lowered and prevent fluid build-up. The plica salpingopharyngea, a mucosal fold at the caudal portion of the Eustachian tube, forms an uninterrupted channel between the medial lamina of the Eustachian tube and the lateral wall of the pharynx. The plica salpingopharyngea can sometimes act as a one-way valve trapping air in the pouch, causing guttural pouch tympany. Each pouch is moulded around the stylohyoid bone which divides the medial and lateral compartments. The medial compartment is much larger, and protrudes more caudally and ventrally.

The epithelium is pseudostratified and ciliated containing mucus-secreting goblet cells; lymph nodules are also present. The compartments of each guttural pouch contain many important structures including several cranial nerves and arteries that lie directly against the pouch as they pass into and out of foramina in the caudal aspect of the skull. The glossopharyngeal, vagus, accessory and hypoglossal nerves; the sympathetic trunk leaving from the cranial cervical ganglion; and the internal carotid all cause a mucosal fold indent within the medial compartment, visible when viewed endoscopically. The facial nerve is in contact with the dorsal part of the pouch. The external carotid artery passes ventral to the medial compartment before crossing to the lateral wall of the lateral compartment. The pouch also covers the temporohyoid joint.

== Function ==
The function of the guttural pouches has been shown with experimental data to participate in the rapid cooling of arterial blood destined for the brain and surrounding structures. In other words, the horse's guttural pouches are 'brain-cooling devices', cooling blood within the internal carotid arteries during hyperthermia that occurs during heavy exercise. However, this proven function has been called into question by another study that neither examined the guttural pouches nor the internal carotid arteries; and others have argued that a cooling function would require an unattainable high rate of inspiratory air flow partly diverted into the guttural pouches.

The issue of necessary guttural pouch air flow rates, to provide rapid cooling of the internal carotid arteries, has been solved by further supporting evidence from microvascular studies of the guttural pouch mucosa. Many of the guttural pouch mucosal superficial arterioles and capillaries extend outwards, forming two types of vascular plexuses surrounding the internal carotid arteries: one with capillary bundles parallel to the internal carotid arteries in the outer layer of the tunica adventitia (outer peri-arterial plexus) and the other with vein-artery-vein triads within the inner layer of the tunica adventitia (inner peri-arterial plexus). These guttural pouch microvascular plexuses, engulfing the internal carotid arteries, are typical of countercurrent heat exchangers recognised in other animal species, supporting the data that guttural pouches participate in selective brain cooling, even at lower air flow rates.

This completes the triad of internal carotid artery cooling that protects the horse's brain from hyperthermia. The triad including the function of guttural pouches achieving arterial cooling, via both by utilizing inspiratory air cooling as well as microvascular countercurrent heat exchangers surrounding internal carotid arteries, and finally afterwards where the internal carotid arteries project upwards passing through the intracranial cavernous venous sinuses accepting cooled venous blood from the nasal sinuses.

== Pathology ==
If the drainage tract becomes blocked for any reason, the mucous secretions can accumulate and cause the pouch to distend, producing a visible and palpable protrusion behind the mandible. The exudate may become contaminated with pathogens. The bacteria Streptococcus equi, the causative agent of strangles, is commonly involved. Mycotic infections can also occur. Some visible symptoms of guttural pouch disease include abnormal head and neck carriage, nasal discharge, painful swelling and occasional abnormal functioning of the structures associated with the pouch. Secondary problems may include inflammation of the middle ear due to migration of the infection along the auditory tube; nasal bleeding caused by damage to the internal carotid artery; with vagus nerve involvement there may be laryngeal hemiplegia (roaring) or difficulty swallowing (also if glossopharyngeal nerve is involved); and Horner's syndrome from the involvement of sympathetic nerves. Involvement of the facial nerve is rare.

As the guttural pouches are covered by respiratory epithelium and mucosa, they have the potential to be affected by all respiratory pathogens. Most infections are self-limiting, requiring no or little medical intervention. Upon endoscopy, affected guttural pouches often house mucopurulent fluid that is in the process of draining.

=== Guttural Pouch Empyema ===
Guttural pouch empyema is characterized by the accretion of purulent, bacteria infested exudate in the pouch. The bacteria is primarily Streptococcus equi, the infectious agent of strangles. Clinically apparent symptoms include painful swelling of the parotid area and recurrent infected nasal discharge, and in severe circumstances, difficulty breathing and abnormal head carriage may be observable. Fever, anorexia, difficulty swallowing and soft palate displacement may or may not be seen. Empyema is often secondary to guttural pouch tympany (distention of the pouches with air) in foals and weanlings. Arabians, in particular, are inclined to guttural pouch tympany, as many have a congenital defect in the pharyngeal orifices of the pouches. The infection can also be due to the rupture of the nearby retropharyngeal lymph nodes, usually caused by an abscess.

Diagnosis is established through and endoscopic examination. Radiographic examination of the area will show an opaque fluid line in the pouch and if a retropharyngeal lymph node is involved, it may reveal a mass. In mild, acute cases of empyema, a saline or polyionic solution lavage is often performed via an endoscope or catheter repeatedly until the exudate drains. Antimicrobial therapy without a lavage seldom remedies the infection. In more complex cases, where concretions have formed, surgical intervention may be necessary to ensure appropriate drainage and removal of the hardened material. The area can be accessed surgically through the Viborg's triangle^{,}.

=== Guttural Pouch Tympany ===
Guttural pouch tympany is an uncommon ailment in which excessive amounts of air become trapped in the pouch, resulting in abnormal expansion. Tympany is usually unilateral, but in some cases can affect both pouches. It is seen most often in young foals and is more common in females than in males. Tympany results in non-painful, soft swelling beneath the ear and behind the jaw. Additional symptoms may include roaring, difficulty breathing, and difficulty swallowing and/or aspiration pneumonia. Diagnosis is achieved through radiography and endoscopic evaluation. The specific cause of guttural pouch tympany is not known, but it is suspected that it is more common when there are defects of the plica salpingopharyngeus, and/or the pharyngeal orifice where they act as a one-way valve that does not allow air to escape. Because of the risk of secondary infection, it is crucial that tympany be treated as soon as possible. Treatment protocols may include, but are not limited to, surgical intervention and in cases where surgery is not an option, insertion of a transnasal Foley balloon catheter in an attempt to remodel the pharyngeal orifice.

=== Guttural Pouch Mycosis ===
Guttural pouch mycosis (GPM) is a fungal disease that is rare but potentially life-threatening. GPM is of unknown pathogenesis currently and no predisposing factors have been identified. Fungal plaque is usually located in the medial guttural pouch, near the internal carotid artery. Clinical signs include unilateral or bilateral epistaxis due to erosion of the artery walls, nasal discharge and cranial nerve dysfunction. GPM is a dangerous condition as spontaneous fatal hemorrhaging can occur, usually within a few days to weeks after the first bout of epistaxis^{,}. The most common fungus associated with GPM is Aspergillosis.

Diagnosis is made based on the history of the animal, presenting clinical signs and endoscopic exploration. Pharmaceutical treatment is not suggested without coinciding surgery. Treatment typically consists of topical as well as systemic antifungal medication, paired with surgery to occlude or embolise affected arteries. Early intervention is necessary to ensure the best chance of survival. Horses that experience dysphagia or other forms of nerve dysfunction as a result of GPM have a poorer prognosis that those who have not exhibited those symptoms.

== See also ==
- Arabian horse
- Equine respiratory system
- Cranial nerves
- Hyrax
- Perissodactyls
- Circle of Willis
