= Aphtha =

Aphtha is the name of several diseases or conditions that cause white discoloration to the mouth, including:

- Candidiasis (or "thrush"), a yeast infection of the mouth
- Oral ulcer, an open sore in the mouth
- Aphthous ulcer (or "canker"), an open sore in the mucous membrane of the mouth
