= Aphthous stomatitis =

Medical condition of benign mouth ulcers forming periodically

- Other names: Recurrent aphthous stomatitis (RAS), recurring oral aphthae, recurrent aphthous ulceration
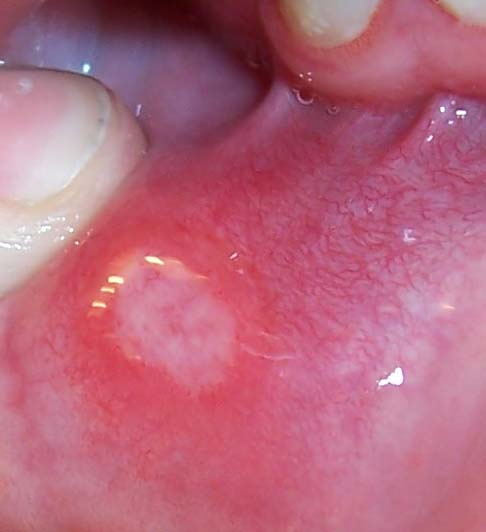
- Canker sore on the lower lip
- Specialty: Oral medicine, dermatology
- Symptoms: A round, often painful sore inside the mouth that is white or gray with a red border; tingling or burning sensation prior to sore development; fever, sluggishness, and/or swollen lymph nodes (severe cases only)
- Complications: Cellulitis (a bacterial skin infection); fever; sores that appear outside of the mouth; pain while brushing teeth, eating, and/or talking
- Usual onset: 1 to 2 days, before visual appearance
- Duration: 7–10 days
- Causes: Behçet's disease; celiac disease; food allergies; HIV infection; lupus; oral injuries; poor oral hygiene; SLS; stress; vitamin deficiency
- Risk factors: Anyone can develop canker sores
- Prevention: Avoiding foods that irritate the mouth, including acidic, hot, or spicy foods; avoiding irritation from gum chewing; avoiding oral hygiene products containing sodium lauryl sulfate; brushing with a soft-bristled brush after meals and flossing daily
- Treatment: Mouth rinses; nutritional supplements; oral medication
- Medication: Good oral hygiene; topical agents
- Frequency: ~20% of people to some degree
- Deaths: None reported

Aphthous stomatitis, or recurrent aphthous stomatitis (RAS), commonly referred to as a canker sore or salt blister, is a common condition characterized by the repeated formation of benign and non-contagious mouth ulcers (aphthae) in otherwise healthy individuals.

The cause is not completely understood but involves a T cell-mediated immune response triggered by a variety of factors which may include nutritional deficiencies, local trauma, stress, hormonal influences, allergies, genetic predisposition, certain foods, dehydration, some food additives, or some hygienic chemical additives like SDS (common in toothpaste).

These ulcers occur periodically and heal completely between attacks. In the majority of cases, the individual ulcers last about 7–10 days, and ulceration episodes occur 3–6 times per year. Most appear on the non-keratinizing epithelial surfaces in the mouth – i.e., anywhere except the attached gingiva, the hard palate, and the dorsum of the tongue. However, the more severe forms, which are less common, may also involve keratinizing epithelial surfaces. Symptoms range from a minor nuisance to interfering with eating and drinking. The severe forms may be debilitating, even causing weight loss due to malnutrition.

The condition is very common, affecting about 20% of the general population to some degree. The onset is often during childhood or adolescence, and the condition usually lasts for several years before gradually disappearing. There is no cure, but treatments such as corticosteroids aim to manage pain, reduce healing time and reduce the frequency of episodes of ulceration.

== Signs and symptoms ==
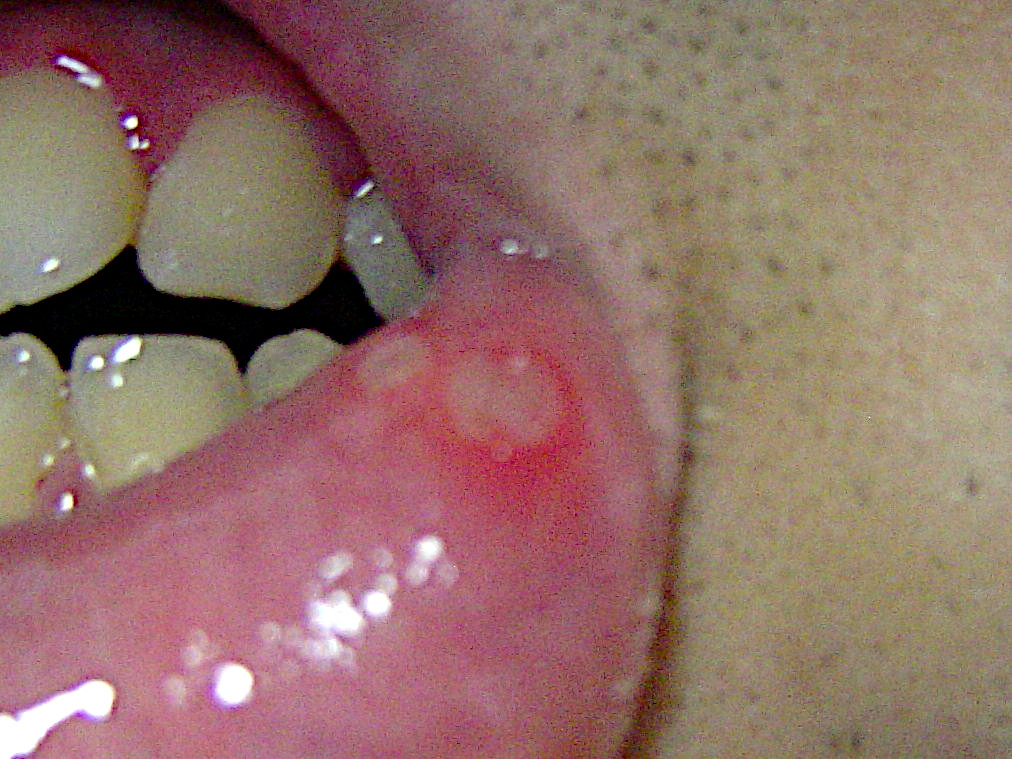
The lower lip is retracted, revealing aphthous ulcers on the buccal mucosa (note erythematous "halo" surrounding ulcers)

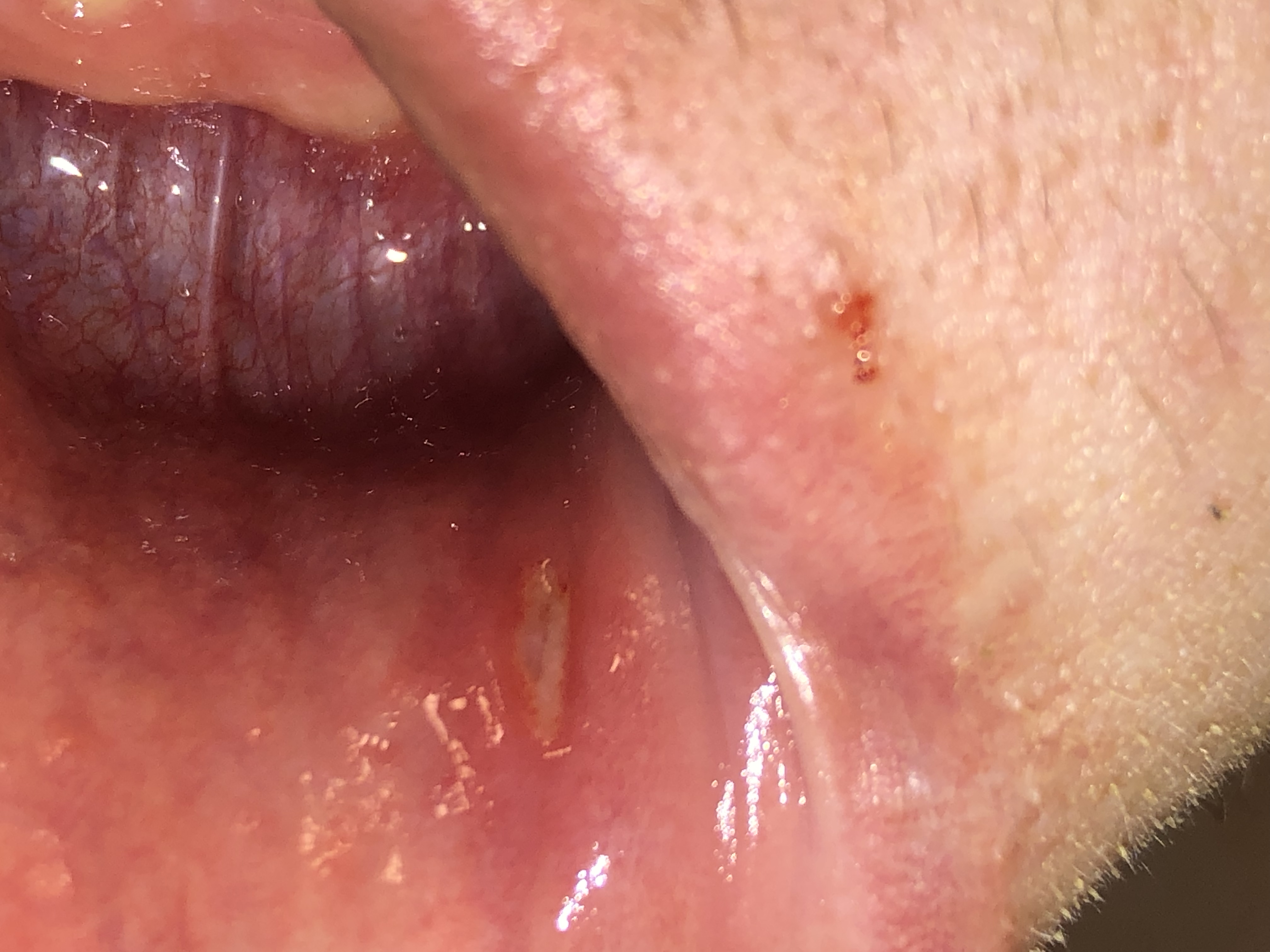
Ulcers can take many shapes and sizes. This one is long and narrow.

Individuals with aphthous stomatitis typically exhibit no detectable systemic symptoms or signs (i.e., outside the mouth). Generally, symptoms may include prodromal sensations such as burning, itching, or stinging, which may precede the appearance of any lesion by some hours; and pain, which is often out of proportion to the extent of the ulceration and is worsened by physical contact, especially with certain foods and drinks (e.g., if they are acidic or abrasive). Pain is worst in the days immediately following the initial formation of the ulcer, and then recedes as healing progresses. If there are lesions on the tongue, speaking and chewing can be uncomfortable. Ulcers on the soft palate, back of the throat, or esophagus can cause painful swallowing. Signs are limited to the lesions themselves.

Ulceration episodes usually occur about 3–6 times per year. However, severe disease is characterized by virtually constant ulceration (new lesions developing before old ones have healed) and may cause debilitating chronic pain and interfere with comfortable eating. In severe cases, this prevents adequate nutrient intake, leading to malnutrition and weight loss.

Aphthous ulcers typically begin as erythematous macules (reddened, flat area of mucosa) which develop into ulcers that are covered with a yellow-grey fibrinous membrane that can be scraped away. A reddish "halo" surrounds the ulcer. The size, number, location, healing time, and periodicity between episodes of ulcer formation are all dependent upon the subtype of aphthous stomatitis.

== Causes ==
The cause is not entirely clear, but is thought to be multifactorial. It has been suggested that aphthous stomatitis is not a single entity, but rather a group of conditions with different causes. Multiple research studies have attempted to identify a causative organism, but aphthous stomatitis appears to be non-contagious, non-infectious, and not sexually transmissible. The mucosal destruction is thought to be the result of a T cell (T lymphocyte) mediated immune response which involves the generation of interleukins and tumor necrosis factor alpha (TNF-α). Mast cells and macrophages are also involved, secreting TNF-α along with the T cells. When early aphthous ulcers are biopsied, the histologic appearance shows a dense inflammatory infiltrate, 80% of which is made up of T cells. Persons with aphthous stomatitis also have circulating lymphocytes which react with peptides 91–105 of heat shock protein 65–60, and the ratio of CD4+ T cells to CD8+ T cells in the peripheral blood of individuals with aphthous stomatitis is decreased.

Aphthous stomatitis has been associated with other autoimmune diseases, namely systemic lupus erythematosus, Behçet's disease and inflammatory bowel diseases. However, common autoantibodies are not detected in most patients, and the condition tends to resolve spontaneously with advancing age rather than worsen.

Evidence for the T cell-mediated mechanism of mucosal destruction is strong. The exact triggers for this process are unknown and are thought to be multiple and varied from one person to the next. This suggests that there are several possible triggers, each of which is capable of producing the disease in different subgroups. In other words, different subgroups appear to have different causes for the condition. These can be considered in three general groups, namely primary immuno-dysregulation, decrease of the mucosal barrier and states of heightened antigenic sensitivity (see below). Risk factors in aphthous stomatitis are also sometimes considered as either host-related or environmental.

=== Immunity ===
At least 40% of people with aphthous stomatitis have a positive family history, suggesting that some people are genetically predisposed to developing oral ulceration. HLA-B12, HLA-B51, HLA-Cw7, HLA-A2, HLA-A11, and HLA-DR2 are examples of human leukocyte antigen types associated with aphthous stomatitis. However, these HLA types are inconsistently associated with the condition, and also vary according to ethnicity. People who have a positive family history of aphthous stomatitis tend to develop a more severe form of the condition, and at an earlier age than is typical.

Stress has effects on the immune system, which may explain why some cases directly correlate with stress. It is often stated that in studies of students with the condition, ulceration is exacerbated during examination periods and lessened during periods of vacation. Alternatively, it has been suggested that oral parafunctional activities such as lip or cheek chewing become more pronounced during periods of stress. Hence, the mucosa is subjected to more trauma.

Aphthous-like ulceration also occurs in conditions involving systemic immuno-dysregulation, e.g., cyclic neutropenia and human immunodeficiency virus infection. In cyclic neutropenia, more severe oral ulceration occurs during periods of severe immuno-dysregulation, and resolution of the underlying neutropenia is associated with healing of the ulcers. The relative increase in percentage of CD8+ T cells, caused by a reduction in numbers of CD4+ T cells may be implicated in RAS-type ulceration in HIV infection.

=== Mucosal barrier ===
The thickness of the mucosa may be an important factor in aphthous stomatitis. Usually, ulcers form on the thinner, non-keratinizing mucosal surfaces in the mouth. Factors which decrease the thickness of the mucosa increase the frequency of occurrence, and factors which increase the thickness of the mucosa correlate with decreased ulceration.

The nutritional deficiencies associated with aphthous stomatitis (vitamin B12, folate, and iron) can all cause a decrease in the thickness of the oral mucosa (atrophy).

Local trauma is also associated with aphthous stomatitis. It is known that trauma can decrease the mucosal barrier. Trauma could occur during injections of local anesthetic in the mouth, or otherwise during dental treatments, frictional trauma from a sharp surface in the mouth, such as a broken tooth, or from tooth brushing.

Hormonal factors can alter the mucosal barrier. In one study, a small group of females with aphthous stomatitis had fewer occurrences of aphthous ulcers during the luteal phase of the menstrual cycle or with use of the contraceptive pill. This phase is associated with a fall in progestogen levels, mucosal proliferation and keratinization. This subgroup often experiences remission during pregnancy. However, other studies report no correlation between aphthous stomatitis and menstrual period, pregnancy or menopause.

Aphthous stomatitis is less common in people who smoke, and there is also a correlation between habit duration and severity of the condition. Tobacco use is associated with an increase in keratinization of the oral mucosa. In extreme forms, this may manifest as leukoplakia or stomatitis nicotina (smoker's keratosis). This increased keratinization may mechanically reinforce the mucosa and reduce the tendency for ulcers to form after minor trauma, or present a more substantial barrier to microbes and antigens, but this is unclear. Nicotine is also known to stimulate the production of adrenal steroids and reduce the production of TNF-α, interleukin-1 and interleukin-6. Smokeless tobacco products also seem to protect against aphthous stomatitis. Cessation of smoking is known to sometimes precede the onset of aphthous stomatitis in people previously unaffected, or exacerbate the condition in those who were already experiencing aphthous ulceration. Despite this correlation, starting smoking again does not usually lessen the condition.

=== Antigenic sensitivity ===
Various antigenic triggers have been implicated as a trigger, including L forms of streptococci, herpes simplex virus, varicella-zoster virus, adenovirus, and cytomegalovirus. Some people with aphthous stomatitis may show herpes virus within the epithelium of the mucosa, but without any productive infection. In some persons, attacks of ulceration occur at the same time as asymptomatic viral shedding and elevated viral titres.

In some instances, recurrent mouth ulcers may be a manifestation of an allergic reaction. Possible allergens include certain foods (e.g., chocolate, coffee, strawberries, eggs, nuts, tomatoes, cheese, citrus fruits, benzoates, cinnamaldehyde, and highly acidic foods), toothpastes, and mouthwashes. Where dietary allergens are responsible, mouth ulcers usually develop within about 12–24 hours of exposure.

Sodium lauryl sulphate (SLS), a detergent present in some brands of toothpaste and other oral healthcare products, may produce oral ulceration in some individuals. It has been shown that aphthous stomatitis is more common in people using toothpastes containing SLS, and that some reduction in ulceration occurs when an SLS-free toothpaste is used.

=== Systemic disease ===
Systemic disorders associated with aphthous-like ulceration

Behçet's disease
Celiac disease
Cyclic neutropenia
Nutritional deficiencies
IgA deficiency
Immunocompromised states, e.g. HIV/AIDS
Inflammatory bowel disease
MAGIC syndrome
PFAPA syndrome
Reactive arthritis
Sweet's syndrome
Ulcus vulvae acutum

Aphthous-like ulceration may occur in association with several systemic disorders (see table). These ulcers are clinically and histopathologically identical to the lesions of aphthous stomatitis, but this type of oral ulceration is not considered to be true aphthous stomatitis by some sources. Some of these conditions may cause ulceration on other mucosal surfaces in addition to the mouth, such as the conjunctiva or the genital mucous membranes. Resolution of the systemic condition often decreases the frequency and severity of oral ulceration.

Behçet's disease is a triad of mouth ulcers, genital ulcers and anterior uveitis. The main feature of Behçet's disease is aphthous-like ulceration, but this is usually more severe than seen in aphthous stomatitis without a systemic cause, and typically resembles major or herpetiform ulceration or both. Aphthous-like ulceration is the first sign of the disease in 25–75% of cases. Behçet's is more common in individuals whose ethnic origin is from regions along the Silk Road (between the Mediterranean and the Far East). It tends to be rare in other countries such as the United States and the United Kingdom. MAGIC syndrome is a possible variant of Behçet's disease, and is associated with aphthous-like ulceration. The name stands for "mouth and genital ulcers with inflamed cartilage" (relapsing polychondritis).

PFAPA syndrome is a rare condition that tends to occur in children. The name stands for "periodic fever, aphthae, pharyngitis (sore throat) and cervical adenitis" (inflammation of the lymph nodes in the neck). The fevers occur periodically about every 3–5 weeks. The condition appears to improve with tonsillectomy or immunosuppression, suggesting an immunologic cause.

In cyclic neutropenia, there is a reduction in the level of circulating neutrophils in the blood that occurs about every 21 days. Opportunistic infections commonly occur, and aphthous-like ulceration is worst during this time.

Hematinic deficiencies (vitamin B12, folic acid and iron), occurring singly or in combination, and with or without any underlying gastrointestinal disease, may be twice as common in people with RAS. However, iron and vitamin supplements only infrequently improve the ulceration. The relationship to vitamin B12 deficiency has been the subject of many studies. Although these studies found that 0–42% of those with recurrent ulcers have a vitamin B12 deficiency, an association with deficiency is rare. Even in the absence of deficiency, vitamin B12 supplementation may be helpful due to unclear mechanisms. Hematinic deficiencies can cause anemia, which is also associated with aphthous-like ulceration.

Gastrointestinal disorders are sometimes associated with aphthous-like stomatitis, e.g., most commonly celiac disease, but also inflammatory bowel disease such as Crohn's disease or ulcerative colitis. The link between gastrointestinal disorders and aphthous stomatitis is probably related to nutritional deficiencies caused by malabsorption. Less than 5% of people with RAS have celiac disease, which can present with a wide range of non-specific symptoms, especially in adults. Sometimes aphthous-like ulcerations can be the only sign of celiac disease. For persons with celiac disease, following a strict gluten-free diet can often end the outbreaks of painful mouth ulcers.

Other examples of systemic conditions associated with aphthous-like ulceration include reactive arthritis, and recurrent erythema multiforme.

== Diagnosis ==
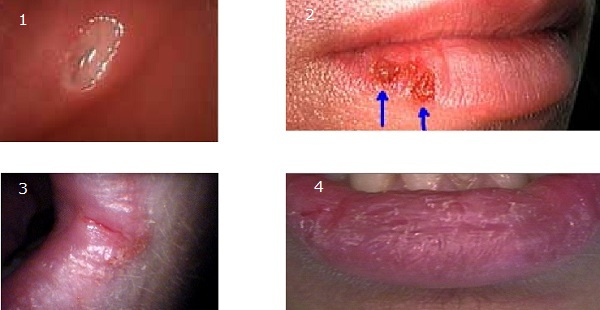
Photographic comparison of: 1. Canker sore (inside the mouth); 2. Herpes simplex; 3. Angular cheilitis; 4. Chapped lips

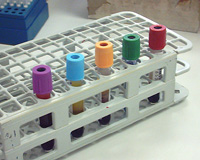
Blood is often taken to assess the hemoglobin, iron, folate and vitamin B12 levels

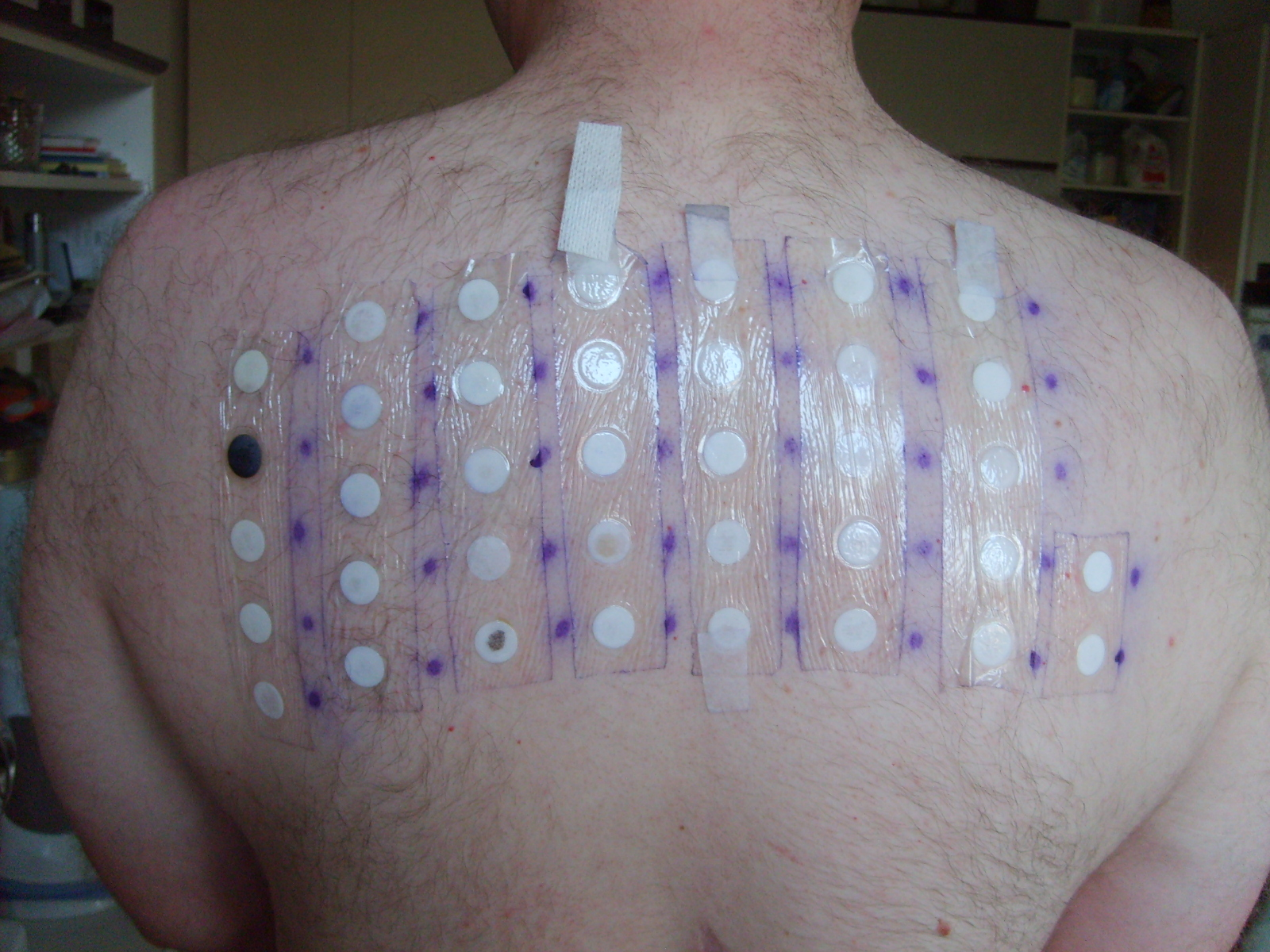
A patch test is sometimes carried out. Areas of the skin on the back are stimulated with various common allergens. The ones which cause an inflammatory reaction may also be involved in recurrent oral ulceration.

Diagnosis is based on the clinical appearance and the medical history. The most important diagnostic feature is a history of recurrent, self-healing ulcers at fairly regular intervals. Although there are many causes of oral ulceration, recurrent oral ulceration has relatively few causes, most commonly aphthous stomatitis, but rarely Behçet's disease, erythema multiforme, ulceration associated with gastrointestinal disease, and recurrent intra-oral herpes simplex infection. A systemic cause is more likely in adults who suddenly develop recurrent oral ulceration with no prior history.

Special investigations may be indicated to rule out other causes of oral ulceration. These include blood tests to exclude anemia, deficiencies of iron, folate or vitamin B12, or celiac disease. However, the nutritional deficiencies may be latent, and the peripheral blood picture may appear relatively normal. Some suggest that screening for celiac disease should form part of the routine workup for individuals complaining of recurrent oral ulceration. Many of the systemic diseases cause other symptoms apart from oral ulceration, which is in contrast to aphthous stomatitis, where there is isolated oral ulceration. Patch testing may be indicated if allergies are suspected (e.g., a strong relationship between certain foods and episodes of ulceration). Several drugs can cause oral ulceration (e.g., nicorandil), and a trial substitution to an alternative drug may highlight a causal relationship.

Tissue biopsy is not usually required, unless to rule out other suspected conditions such as oral squamous cell carcinoma. The histopathologic appearance is not pathognomonic (the microscopic appearance is not specific to the condition). Early lesions have a central zone of ulceration covered by a fibrinous membrane. In the connective tissue deep to the ulcer there is increased vascularity and a mixed inflammatory infiltrate composed of lymphocytes, histiocytes and polymorphonuclear leukocytes. The epithelium on the margins of the ulcer shows spongiosis and there are many mononuclear cells in the basal third. There are also lymphocytes and histiocytes in the connective tissue surrounding deeper blood vessels near to the ulcer, described histologically as "perivascular cuffing".

=== Classification ===
Aphthous stomatitis has been classified as a non-infectious stomatitis (inflammation of the mouth). One classification distinguishes "common simple aphthae", accounting for 95% of cases, with 3–6 attacks per year, rapid healing, minimal pain and restriction of ulceration to the mouth; and "complex aphthae", accounting for 5% of cases, where ulcers may be present on the genital mucosa in addition to mouth, healing is slower and pain is more severe. A more common method of classifying aphthous stomatitis is into three variants, distinguished by the size, number and location of the lesions, the healing time of individual ulcers and whether a scar is left after healing (see below).

==== Minor aphthous ulceration ====
This is the most common type of aphthous stomatitis, accounting for about 80–85% of all cases. This subtype is termed minor aphthous ulceration (MiAU), or minor recurrent aphthous stomatitis (MiRAS). The lesions themselves may be referred to as minor aphthae or minor aphthous ulcers. These lesions are generally less than 10 mm in diameter (usually about 2–3 mm), and affect non-keratinized mucosal surfaces (i.e. the labial and buccal mucosa, lateral borders of the tongue and the floor of the mouth). Several ulcers usually appear at the same time, but single ulcers are possible. Healing usually takes seven to ten days and leaves no scar. Between episodes of ulceration, there is usually an ulcer-free period of variable length.

==== Major aphthous ulceration ====
This subtype comprises 10% of all cases of aphthous stomatitis. It is termed major aphthous ulceration (MaAU) or major recurrent aphthous stomatitis (MaRAS). Major aphthous ulcers (major aphthae) are similar to minor aphthous ulcers, but are more than 10 mm in diameter and the ulceration is deeper. Because the lesions are larger, healing takes longer (about twenty to thirty days), and may leave scars. Each episode of ulceration usually produces a greater number of ulcers, and the time between attacks is less than seen in minor aphthous stomatitis. Major aphthous ulceration usually affects non-keratinized mucosal surfaces. However, less commonly, keratinized mucosa may also be involved, such as the dorsum (top surface) of the tongue or the gingiva (gums). The soft palate or the fauces (back of the throat) may also be involved, the latter being part of the oropharynx rather than the oral cavity. Compared to minor aphthous ulceration, major aphthae tend to have an irregular outline.

==== Herpetiform ulceration ====
Herpetiform ulcers, (also termed stomatitis herpetiformis, or herpes-like ulcerations) is a subtype of aphthous stomatitis so named because the lesions resemble a primary infection with herpes simplex virus (primary herpetic gingivostomatitis). However, herpetiform ulceration is not caused by herpes viruses. As with all types of aphthous stomatitis, it is not contagious. Unlike true herpetic ulcers, herpetiform ulcers are not preceded by vesicles (small, fluid-filled blisters). Herpetiform ulcers are less than 1 mm in diameter and occur in variably sized crops up to one hundred at a time. Adjacent ulcers may merge to form larger, continuous areas of ulceration. Healing occurs within fifteen days without scarring. The ulceration may affect keratinized mucosal surfaces in addition to non keratinized. Herpetiform ulceration is often extremely painful, and the lesions recur more frequently than minor or major aphthous ulcers. Recurrence may be so frequent that ulceration is virtually continuous. It generally occurs in a slightly older age group than the other subtypes, and females are affected slightly more frequently than males.

==== RAS type ulceration ====
Recurrent oral ulceration associated with systemic conditions is termed "RAS-type ulceration", "RAS-like ulceration", or "aphthous-like ulcers". Aphthous stomatitis occurs in individuals with no associated systemic disease. Persons with certain systemic diseases may be prone to oral ulceration, but this is secondary to the underlying medical condition (see the systemic disease section). This kind of ulceration is considered by some to be separate from true aphthous stomatitis. However, this definition is not strictly applied. For example, many sources refer to oral ulceration caused by anemia and/or nutritional deficiencies as aphthous stomatitis, and some also consider Behçet's disease to be a variant.

== Treatment ==
The vast majority of people with aphthous stomatitis have minor symptoms and do not require any specific therapy. The pain is often tolerable with simple dietary modification during an episode of ulceration such as avoiding spicy and acidic foods and beverages. Many different topical and systemic medications have been proposed (see table), sometimes showing little or no evidence of usefulness when formally investigated. Some of the results of interventions for RAS may in truth represent a placebo effect. No therapy is curative, with treatment aiming to relieve pain, promote healing and reduce the frequency of episodes of ulceration.

=== Medication ===
The first line of therapy for aphthous stomatitis is topical agents rather than systemic medication, with topical corticosteroids being the mainstay treatment. Systemic treatment is usually reserved for severe disease due to the risk of adverse side effects associated with many of these agents. A systematic review found that no single systemic intervention was found to be effective. Good oral hygiene is important to prevent secondary infection of the ulcers.

Occasionally, in females where ulceration is correlated to the menstrual cycle or birth control pills, progestogen or a change in birth control may be beneficial. Use of nicotine replacement therapy for people who have developed oral ulceration after stopping smoking has also been reported. Starting smoking again does not usually lessen the condition. Trauma can be reduced by avoiding rough or sharp foodstuffs and by brushing teeth with care. If sodium lauryl sulfate is suspected to be the cause, avoidance of products containing this chemical may be useful and prevent recurrence in some individuals. Similarly, patch testing may indicate that food allergy is responsible, and the diet is modified accordingly. If investigations reveal deficiency states, correction of the deficiency may result in resolution of the ulceration. For example, there is some evidence that vitamin B12 supplementation may prevent recurrence in some individuals.

Medications
Drug type	Intended action	Example(s)
Topical covering agents / barriers	Reduce pain	Orabase (often combined with triamcinolone).
Topical analgesics / anesthetics / anti-inflammatory agents	Reduce pain	Benzydamine hydrochloride mouthwash or spray, Amlexanox paste, viscous lidocaine, diclofenac in hyaluronan.
Topical chemical cautery	Reduce pain	Sulfonated phenolics/sulfuric acid
Topical antiseptics	Speed healing (prevent secondary infection)	Doxycycline, tetracycline, minocycline, chlorhexidine gluconate, triclosan.
Topical mild potency corticosteroids	Reduce inflammation	Hydrocortisone sodium succinate.
Topical moderate potency corticosteroids	Reduce inflammation	Beclomethasone dipropionate aerosol, fluocinonide, clobetasol, betamethasone sodium phosphate, dexamethasone.
Systemic medications	Various, mostly modulating immune response	Prednisolone, colchicine, pentoxifylline, azathioprine, thalidomide, dapsone, mycophenolate mofetil, adalimumab, vitamin B12, Clofazimine, Levamisole, Montelukast, Sulodexide,
Vitamin	Improvement of vitamin deficiency	iron (p.o.), folic acid, hydroxocobalamin (i.v.)

=== Other ===
Surgical excision of aphthous ulcers has been described, but it is an ineffective and inappropriate treatment. Silver nitrate has also been used as a chemical cauterant. Apart from the mainstream approaches detailed above, there are numerous treatments of unproven effectiveness, ranging from herbal remedies to otherwise alternative treatments, including Aloe vera, Myrtus communis, Rosa damascena, potassium alum, nicotine, polio virus vaccine and prostaglandin E2. A 2023 Master Thesis by a student in Western Cape University, South Africa, found that supplementation with vitamin B12, zinc sulfate and omega-3 seem to be beneficial in the management of RAS.

== Prognosis ==
By definition, there is no serious underlying medical condition, and most importantly, the ulcers do not represent oral cancer, nor are they infectious. However, aphthae are capable of causing significant discomfort. There is a spectrum of severity, with symptoms ranging from a minor nuisance to disabling. Due to pain during eating, weight loss may develop as a result of not eating in severe cases of aphthous stomatitis. Usually, the condition lasts for several years before spontaneously disappearing in later life.

== Epidemiology ==
Aphthous stomatitis affects between 5% and 66% of people, with about 20% of individuals in most populations having the condition to some degree. This makes it the most common disease of the oral mucosa. Aphthous stomatitis occurs worldwide, but is more common in developed countries.

Within nations, it is more common in higher socioeconomic groups. Males and females are affected in an equal ratio, and the peak age of onset is between 10 and 19 years. About 80% of people with aphthous stomatitis first developed the condition before the age of 30. There have been reports of ethnic variation. For example, in the United States, aphthous stomatitis may be three times more common in white-skinned people than black-skinned people.

== History, society and culture ==
"Aphthous affectations" and "aphthous ulcerations" of the mouth are mentioned several times in the treatise "Of the Epidemics" (part of the Hippocratic corpus, in the 4th century BCE), although it seems likely that this was oral ulceration as a manifestation of some infectious disease, since they are described as occurring in epidemic-like patterns, with concurrent symptoms such as fever.

Aphthous stomatitis was once thought to be a form of recurrent herpes simplex virus infection, and some clinicians still refer to the condition as "herpes" despite this cause having been disproven.

The informal term "canker sore" is sometimes used, mainly in North America, either to describe this condition generally, or to refer to the individual ulcers of this condition, or mouth ulcers of any cause unrelated to this condition. The origin of the word "canker" is thought to have been influenced by Latin, Old English, Middle English and Old North French. In Latin, cancer translates to "malignant tumor" or literally "crab" (related to the likening of sectioned tumors to the limbs of a crab). The closely related word in Middle English and Old North French, chancre, now more usually applied to syphilis, is also thought to be involved. Despite this etymology, aphthous stomatitis is not a form of cancer but rather entirely benign.

An aphtha (plural aphthae) is a non-specific term that refers to an ulcer of the mouth. The word is derived from the Greek word aphtha meaning "eruption" or "ulcer". The lesions of several other oral conditions are sometimes described as aphthae, including Bednar's aphthae (infected, traumatic ulcers on the hard palate in infants), oral candidiasis, and foot-and-mouth disease. When used without qualification, aphthae commonly refers to lesions of recurrent aphthous stomatitis. Since the word aphtha is often taken to be synonymous with ulcer, it has been suggested that the term "aphthous ulcer" is redundant, but it remains in common use. Stomatitis is also a non-specific term referring to any inflammatory process in the mouth, with or without oral ulceration. It may describe many different conditions apart from aphthous stomatitis, such as angular stomatitis.

The current most widely used medical term is "recurrent aphthous stomatitis" or simply "aphthous stomatitis". Historically, many different terms have been used to refer to recurrent aphthous stomatitis or its sub-types, and some are still in use. Mikulicz's aphthae is a synonym of minor RAS, named after Jan Mikulicz-Radecki. Synonyms for major RAS include Sutton's ulcers (named after Richard Lightburn Sutton), Sutton's disease, Sutton's syndrome and periadenitis mucosa necrotica recurrens. Synonyms for aphthous stomatitis as a whole include (recurrent) oral aphthae, (recurrent) aphthous ulceration and (oral) aphthosis.

In traditional Chinese medicine, claimed treatments for aphthae focus on clearing heat and nourishing Yin.

Rembrandt Gentle White toothpaste did not contain sodium lauryl sulfate, and was specifically marketed as being for the benefit of "canker sore sufferers". When the manufacturer Johnson & Johnson discontinued the product in 2014, it caused a backlash of anger from long-term customers, and the toothpaste began to sell for many times the original price on the auction website eBay.

== See also ==
- Acute necrotizing ulcerative gingivitis, also known as "trench mouth"—another painful, non-contagious mouth infection with similar symptoms
- CankerMelts (licorice)
- Mouth ulcer
