= Sulfonated phenolics/sulfuric acid =

Medication

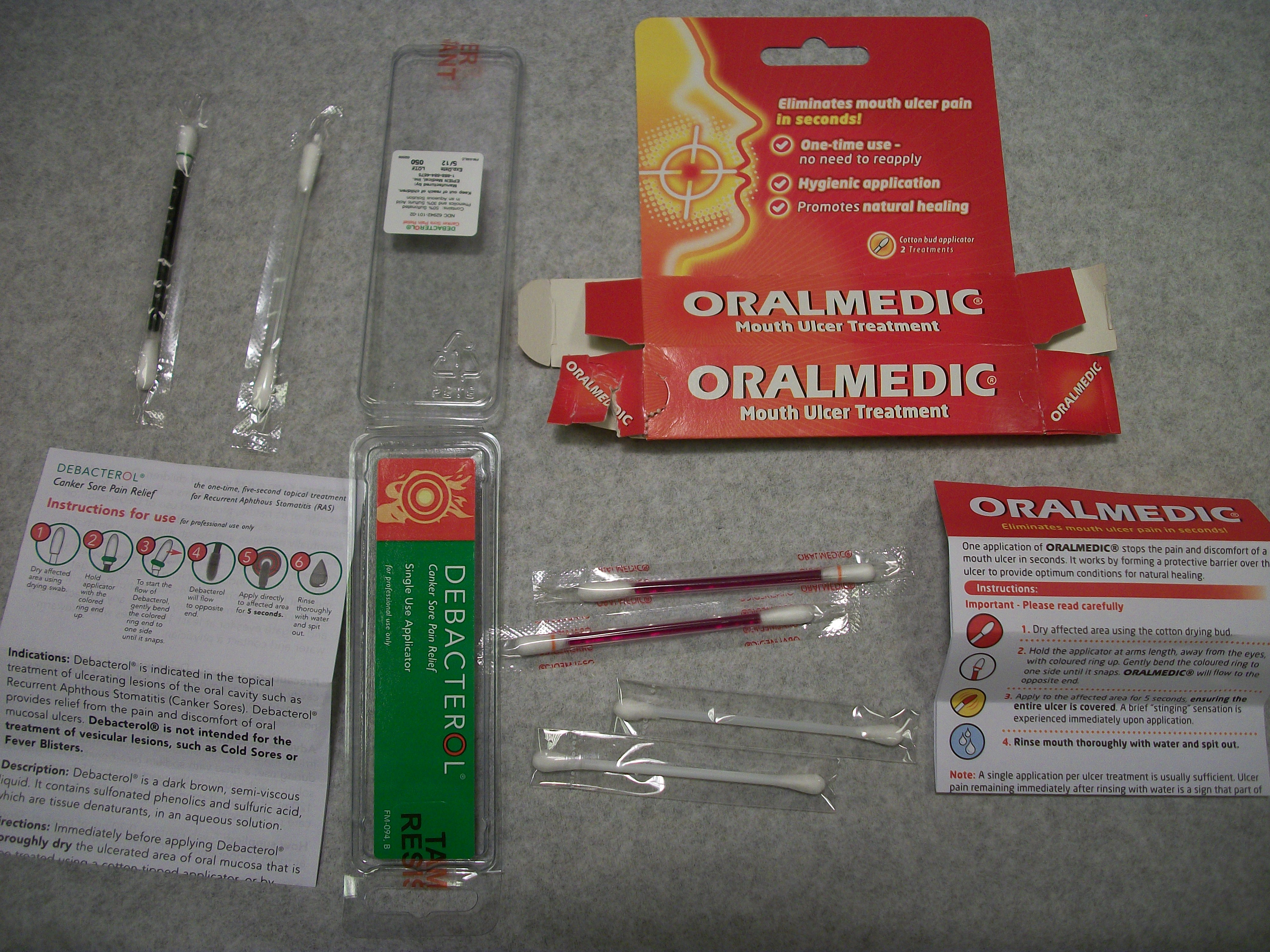

Combination of
- Sulfuric acid: Mineral acid
- Sulfonated phenolics: Sulfonic acid

Clinical data
- Trade names: Debacterol, Oralmedic
- Routes of administration: Topical
- ATC code: none

Legal status
- Legal status: US: Not FDA approved

Identifiers
- CAS Number: 7664-93-9 1333-39-7
- ChemSpider: none
- UNII: O40UQP6WCF

Sulfonated phenolics/sulfuric acid (brand name Debacterol) is a liquid topical agent that is used in the treatment of ulcerating oral mucosal lesions and minor oral abrasions.

== Description ==
Sulfonated phenolics/sulfuric acid is used in the treatment of recurrent aphthous stomatitis (canker sores). Debacterol is available as a swab and in a liquid formulation.

Sulfonated phenolics/sulfuric acid is not listed in the Physician's Desk Reference and has not been approved by the Food and Drug Administration for any indication. Debacterol is not an antiseptic or topical anesthetic but rather a chemical cautery agent that destroy cells at the application site, including nerve endings that transmit pain.

== Effectiveness ==
One clinical trial comparing Debacterol to Kenalog-in-Orabase and a no-intervention control group found that patients treated with sulfonated phenolics/sulfuric acid reported significantly better relief of symptoms compared to the other two groups three days after treatment. In the same study, 60 percent of ulcers treated with Debacterol had disappeared by day six compared to about 30 percent in the other treatment groups.

Sulfonated phenolics/sulfuric acid appears to be more effective on sores in areas of the mouth that produce less saliva. Since a sore must be dry prior to application of Debacterol, it is difficult to properly apply under the tongue. The duration of pain relief and the overall effectiveness may be reduced in such areas.
