= Stomatitis =

Inflammation of the mouth and lips

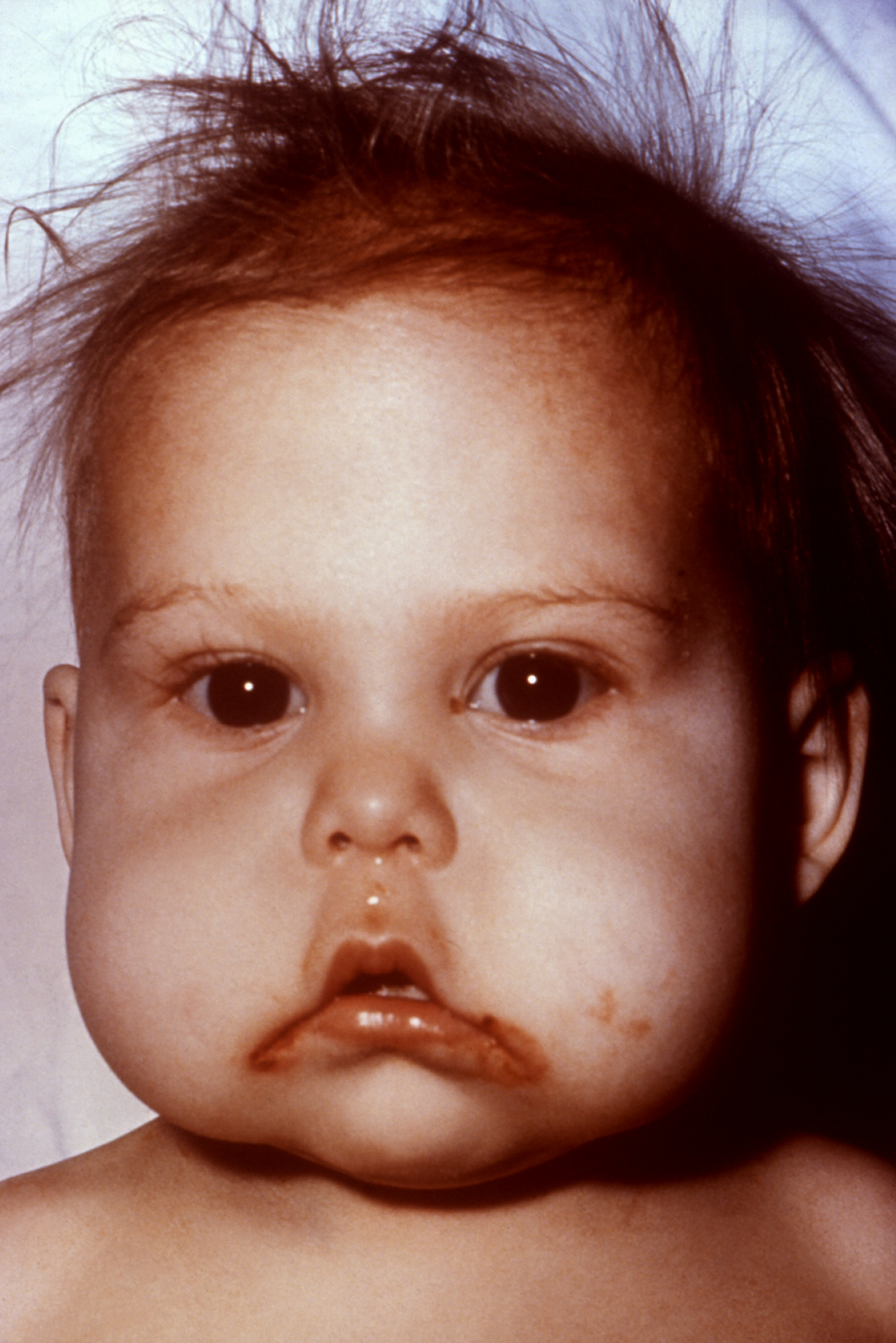
- An infant with stomatitis due to kwashiorkor and an accompanying Vitamin B deficiency.
- Specialty: Dermatology

Stomatitis is inflammation of the mouth and lips. It refers to any inflammatory process affecting the mucous membranes of the mouth and lips, with or without oral ulceration.

In its widest meaning, stomatitis can have a multitude of different causes and appearances. Common causes include infections, nutritional deficiencies, allergic reactions, radiotherapy, and many others.

When inflammation of the gums and the mouth generally presents itself, sometimes the term gingivostomatitis is used, though this is also sometimes used as a synonym for herpetic gingivostomatitis.

The term is derived from Greek στόμα (stoma) 'mouth' and -ῖτις (-itis) 'inflammation'.

== Causes ==
=== Nutritional deficiency ===
Malnutrition (improper dietary intake) or malabsorption (poor absorption of nutrients into the body) can lead to nutritional deficiency states, several of which can lead to stomatitis. For example, deficiencies of iron, vitamin B2 (riboflavin), vitamin B3 (niacin), vitamin B6 (pyridoxine), vitamin B9 (folic acid) or vitamin B12 (cobalamine) may all manifest as stomatitis. Iron is necessary for the upregulation of transcriptional elements for cell replication and repair. Lack of iron can cause genetic downregulation of these elements, leading to ineffective repair and regeneration of epithelial cells, especially in the mouth and lips. Many disorders which cause malabsorption can cause deficiencies, which in turn causes stomatitis. Examples include tropical sprue.

=== Aphthous stomatitis ===
Aphthous stomatitis (canker sores) is the recurrent appearance of mouth ulcers in otherwise healthy individuals. The cause is not completely understood, but it is thought that the condition represents a T cell mediated immune response which is triggered by a variety of factors. The individual ulcers (aphthae) recur periodically and heal completely, although in the more severe forms, new ulcers may appear in other parts of the mouth before the old ones have finished healing. Aphthous stomatitis is one of the most common diseases of the oral mucosa, and is thought to affect about 20% of the general population to some degree. The symptoms range from a minor nuisance to being disabling in their impact on eating, swallowing, and talking, and the severe forms can cause people to lose weight. There is no cure for aphthous stomatitis, and therapies are aimed at alleviating the pain, reducing the inflammation and promoting healing of the ulcers, but there is little evidence of efficacy for any treatment that has been used.

=== Angular stomatitis ===
Inflammation of the corners (angles) of the lips is termed angular stomatitis or angular cheilitis. In children a frequent cause is repeated lip-licking, and in adults it may be a sign of underlying iron deficiency anemia, or vitamin B deficiencies (e.g., B_{2}-riboflavin, B_{9}-folate, or B_{12}-cobalamin, which in turn may be evidence of poor diets or malnutrition such as celiac disease).

Also, angular cheilitis can be caused by a patient's jaws at rest being 'overclosed' due to edentulousness or tooth wear, causing the jaws to come to rest closer together than if the complete/unaffected dentition were present. This causes skin folds around the angle of the mouth which are kept moist by saliva, which in turn favours infection; mostly by Candida albicans or similar species. Treatment usually involves the administration of topical nystatin or similar antifungal agents. Another treatment can be to correct the jaw relationship with dental treatment (e.g., dentures or occlusal adjustment).

=== Denture-related stomatitis ===
This is a common condition present in denture wearers. It appears as reddened but painless mucosa beneath the denture. 90% of cases are associated with Candida species, and it is the most common form of oral candidiasis. Treatment is by antifungal medication and improved dental hygiene, such as not wearing the denture during sleep.

=== Allergic contact stomatitis ===
Allergic contact stomatitis (also termed "allergic gingivostomatitis" or "allergic contact gingivostomatitis") is a type IV (delayed) hypersensitivity reaction that occurs in susceptible atopic individuals when allergens penetrate the skin or mucosa.

Allergens, which may be different for different individuals, combine with epithelial-derived proteins, forming haptens which bind with Langerhans cells in the mucosa, which in turn present the antigen on their surface to T lymphocytes, sensitizing them to that antigen and causing them to produce many specific clones. The second time that specific antigen is encountered, an inflammatory reaction is triggered at the site of exposure. Allergic contact stomatitis is less common than allergic contact dermatitis because the mouth is coated in saliva, which washes away antigens and acts as a barrier. The oral mucosa is also more vascular (has a better blood supply) than skin, meaning that any antigens are more quickly removed from the area by the circulation. Finally, there is substantially less keratin in oral mucosa, meaning that there is less likelihood that haptens will form.

Allergic contact stomatitis appears as non-specific inflammation, so it may be mistaken for chronic physical irritation. There may be burning or soreness of the mouth and ulceration. Chronic exposure to the allergen may result in a lichenoid lesion. Plasma cell gingivitis may also occur, which may be accompanied by glossitis and cheilitis.

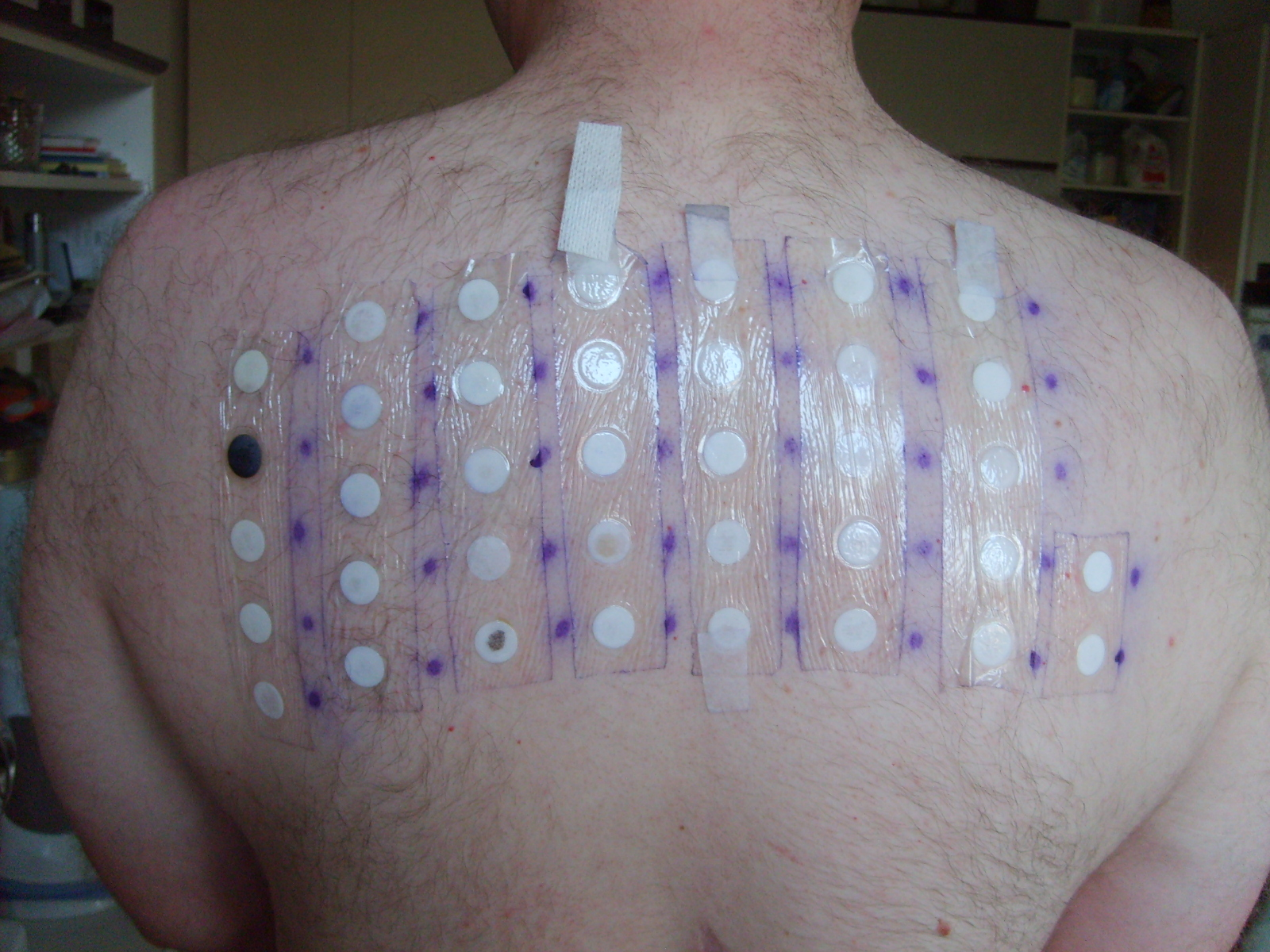
Patch test

Allergens that may cause allergic contact stomatitis in some individuals include cinnamaldehyde, Balsam of Peru, peppermint, mercury, gold, pyrophosphates, zinc citrate, free acrylic monomer, nickel, fluoride, and sodium lauryl sulfate. These allergens may originate from many sources, including various foods and drink, chewing gum, toothpaste, mouthwash, dental floss, dental fillings, dentures, orthodontic bands or wires, and many other sources. If the substance containing the allergen comes into contact with the lips, allergic contact cheilitis can occur, together with allergic contact stomatitis.

The diagnosis is confirmed by patch test, and management is by avoidance of exposure to the allergen.

=== Migratory stomatitis ===
Migratory stomatitis (or geographic stomatitis) is an atypical presentation of a condition which normally presents on the tongue, termed geographic tongue. Geographic tongue is so named because there are atrophic, erythematous areas of depapillation that migrate over time, giving a map-like appearance.

In migratory stomatitis, other mucosal sites in the mouth, such as the ventral surface (undersurface) of the tongue, buccal mucosa, labial mucosa, soft palate, or floor of mouth may be afflicted with identical lesions, usually in addition to the tongue. Apart from not being restricted to the tongue, migratory stomatitis is an identical condition in every regard to geographic tongue. Another synonym for geographic tongue which uses the term stomatitis is "stomatitis areata migrans".

=== Herpetic gingivostomatitis ===
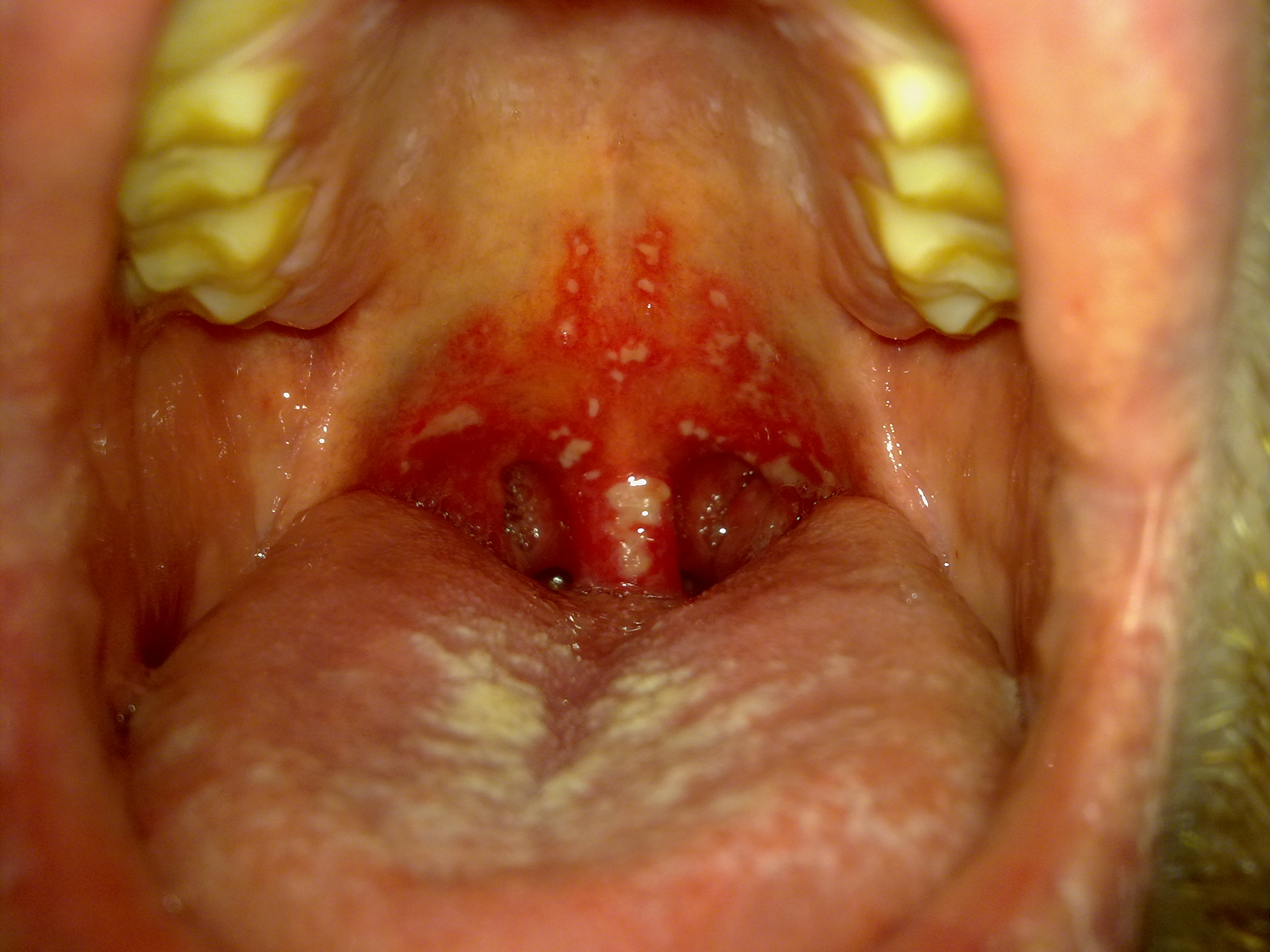
Herpetic stomatitis (herpetic gingivostomatitis)

This is inflammation of the mouth caused by herpes simplex virus.

=== Irradiation and chemotherapy ===
Stomatitis may also be caused by chemotherapy, or radiation therapy of the oropharyngeal area. The term mucositis is sometimes used synonymously with stomatitis, however the former usually refers to mucosal reactions to radiotherapy or chemotherapy, and may occur anywhere in the gastrointestinal tract and not just in the mouth.

=== Necrotizing ulcerative gingivostomatitis ===
The term necrotizing ulcerative gingivostomatitis is sometimes used as a synonym of the necrotizing periodontal disease more commonly termed necrotizing ulcerative gingivitis, or a more severe form (also termed necrotizing stomatitis). The term necrotizing gingivostomatitis is also sometimes used.

=== Stomatitis nicotina ===
Also called smoker's palatal keratosis, this condition may occur in smokers, especially pipe smokers. The palate appears dry and cracked, and white from keratosis. The minor salivary glands appear as small, red and swollen bumps. It is not a premalignant condition, and the appearance reverses if the smoking is stopped.

=== Chronic ulcerative stomatitis ===
Chronic ulcerative stomatitis is a condition with specific immunopathologic features, which was first described in 1990. It is characterized by erosions and ulcerations which relapse and remit. Lesions are located on the buccal mucosa (inside of the cheeks) or on the gingiva (gums). The condition resembles oral lichen planus when biopsied.

The diagnosis is made by microscopic examination of biopsy tissue: direct immunofluorescence can reveal the presence of antinuclear antibodies specifically directed against the ΔNp63α form of the p63 protein, which is normally expressed within the basal layer of stratified epithelium. Treatment with hydroxychloroquine can be effective.

=== Plasma cell gingivostomatitis ===
Terms such as plasma cell gingivostomatitis, atypical gingivostomatitis and idiopathic gingivostomatitis are sometimes a synonym for plasma cell gingivitis, or specifically to refer to a severe form of plasma cell gingivitis.

=== Other forms of stomatitis ===
- Periodic fever, aphthous stomatitis, pharyngitis and adenitis (PFAPA) syndrome—occurs in children.
- Uremic stomatitis—a rare form of stomatitis that occurs with kidney failure.
- Pyostomatitis vegetans
- Bovine papular stomatitis
- Feline stomatitis

== Stomatitis in reptiles and non-mammalian species ==
Little is known in what ways stomatitis affects wild reptiles or how frequently it occurs. Contrastingly, stomatitis is seen extensively in captive-raised reptilian species as one of the most commonly developed illnesses, informally referred to as “mouth rot”.

=== Causes ===
Though this oral inflammation is seen in both humans and reptiles, the overall causes differ slightly. Underlying catalysts responsible for escalating inflammation, such as nutritional deficiencies and immunodepression, are seen in both species. However, many Homo sapian-specific mechanisms and medical interventions are not responsible for the development of stomatitis in reptilian species. More common occurrences that lead to this diagnosis include ingestion of substrate, injury by prey, or other oral trauma. This trauma introduces previously occurring oral bacteria to the injury site. Though these oral bacteria are generally harmless, they have the potential to become pathogenic in certain circumstances, especially in immunosuppressed or deficient states.

=== Immunological Response to Pathogenic Bacteria ===
In these pathogenic circumstances, vasodilation (restriction of the blood vessels) and edema (swelling) are similar to that of stomatitis in humans. However, instead of the primary response of neutrophils in humans, we see the response by heterophils, the reptilian and avian equivalent. Due to bacterial toxins by the pathogen and destructive enzymes by the heterophils, local tissue cells undergo necrosis (tissue death). Unlike mammalian species, reptiles lack the necessary enzymes to break down these dead tissue cells, resulting in a thick, dry pus known as caseous exudate.

If infection goes untreated, the immune system attempts to block off the infection by incasing it in layers of macrophages, heterophils, and connective tissues, forming an abscess. If this containment fails, the bone of the mandible may become infected, the bacteria may enter the organism's blood stream, and/or the caseous exudate may be aspirated, resulting in bacterial pneumonia and possible death.
