= Labial artery =

Labial artery may refer to

- Inferior labial artery
- Posterior labial arteries
- Prominent inferior labial artery
- Superior labial artery
