= Angina (disambiguation) =

Angina pectoris is chest pain due to ischemia (a lack of blood and hence oxygen supply) of the heart muscle

Angina, a medical term generally referring to a constriction, may also refer to:

- Angina animi, a subjective sense that one is dying, which may accompany cardiac ischemia or other conditions
- Abdominal angina, postprandial abdominal pain that occurs in individuals with insufficient blood flow to meet visceral demands
- Ludwig's angina, a serious, potentially life-threatening infection of the tissues of the floor of the mouth
- Prinzmetal's angina, a syndrome typically consisting of cardiac chest pain at rest that occurs in cycles
- Vincent's angina, an infection of the tonsils caused by spirochaeta and treponema
- Angina tonsillaris, an inflammation of the tonsils
- Angina bullosa haemorrhagica, blood blisters in the mucous membranes of the mouth
- Herpangina, pharyngeal blisters caused by Coxsackie A virus or Echovirus
- Angine de Poitrine, exprimental rock duo from Québec
