= Bednar's aphthae =

Bednar aphthae
- Specialty: Gastroenterology

Bednar's aphthae is a type of oral ulceration (mouth ulcers) which occurs in infants. The lesions are located on the palate and are caused by trauma. No treatment is required since the lesions heal within a few days.

The condition was first described in 1850, by the Austrian physician Alois Bednar (1816-1888).
