= Necrotizing sialometaplasia =

Benign ulcer in the back of the oral palate

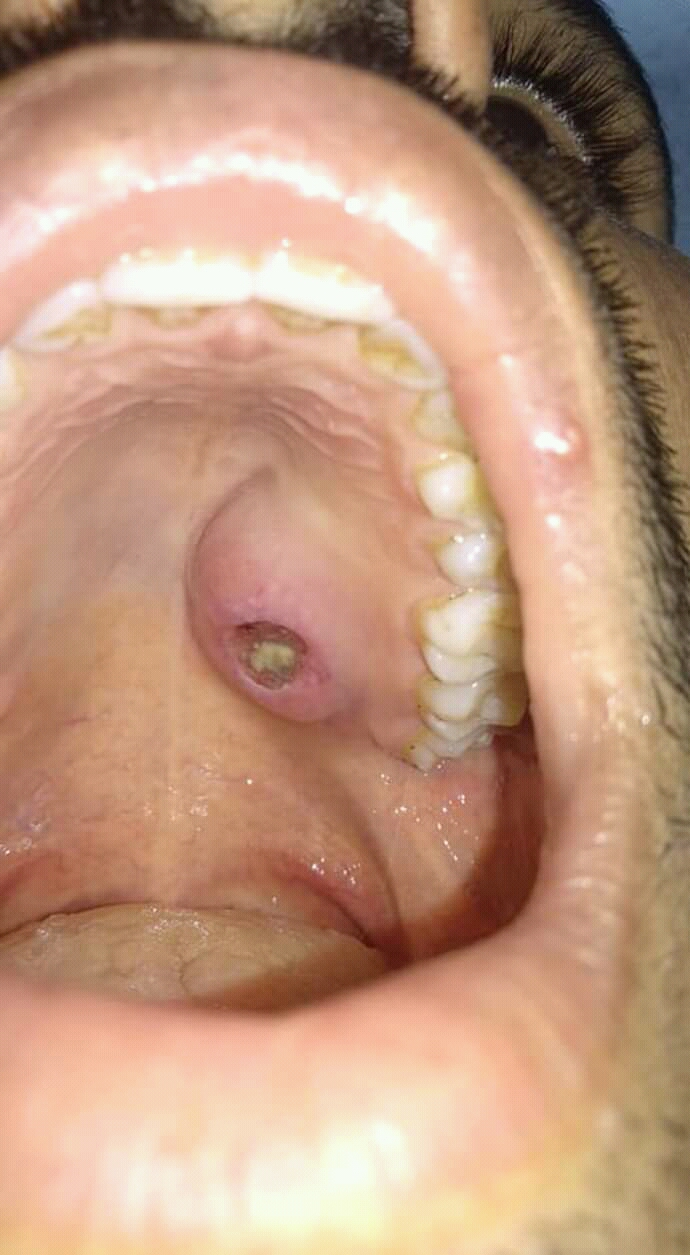
- Specialty: ENT surgery

Necrotizing sialometaplasia (NS) is a benign, ulcerative lesion, usually located towards the back of the hard palate. It is thought to be caused by ischemic necrosis (death of tissue due to lack of blood supply) of minor salivary glands in response to trauma. Often painless, the condition is self-limiting and should heal in 6–10 weeks.

Although entirely benign and requiring no treatment, due to its similar appearance to oral cancer, it is sometimes misdiagnosed as malignant. Therefore, it is considered an important condition, despite its rarity.

== Signs and symptoms ==
The condition most commonly is located at the junction of the hard and soft palate. However, the condition may arise anywhere minor salivary glands are located. (Note: Minor salivary glands are found in most mucosal surfaces in the mouth, apart from the front third of the hard palate, the front third of the dorsal surface of the tongue, and the attached gingiva. (see Hupp et al. 2013, p.395)) It has also been occasionally reported to involve the major salivary glands. It may be present only on one side, or both sides. The lesion typically is 1–4 cm in diameter.

Initially, the lesion is a tender, erythematous (red) swelling. Later, in the ulcerated stage, the overlying mucosa breaks down to leave a deep, well-circumscribed ulcer which is yellow-gray in color and has a lobular base.

There is usually only minor pain, and the condition is often entirely painless. There may be prodromal symptoms similar to flu before the appearance of the lesion.

== Causes ==
The exact cause of the condition is unknown. There is most evidence to support vascular infarction and ischemic necrosis of salivary gland lobules as a mechanism for the condition. Experimentally, local anaesthetic injections and tying of the arteries is reported to trigger the development of tissue changes similar to NS in lab rats. Factors which are thought to cause this ischemia are listed below, however sometimes there is no evident predisposing factor or initiating event.

- Trauma e.g. during intubation, or surgical procedures
- Local anesthetic injection
- Smoking
- Alcohol
- Diabetes mellitus
- Vascular disease, (e.g. arteriosclerosis)
- Pressure from a dental prosthesis
- Allergy
- Bulimia
- Infection
- Ionizing radiation

== Diagnosis ==
Differentiation between this and SCC would be based on a history of recent trauma or dental treatment in the area.

Immunohistochemistry may aid the diagnosis. If the lesion is NS, there will be focal to absent immunoreactivity for p53, low immunoreactivity for MIB1 (Ki-67), and the presence of 4A4/p63- and calponin-positive myoepithelial cells.

== Treatment ==
No surgery is required.

== Prognosis ==
Healing is prolonged, and usually takes 6–10 weeks. The ulcer heals by secondary intention.

== Epidemiology ==
The condition is rare. The typical age range of those affected by the condition is about 23–66 years of age. It usually occurs in smokers. The male to female ratio has been reported as 1.95:1, and 2.31:1.

== History ==
NS was first reported by Abrams et al. in 1973.
