= Richard Lightburn Sutton =

American dermatologist (1878–1952)

Richard Lightburn Sutton Sr.
- Born: July 9, 1878; Rock Port
- Died: May 18, 1952 (aged 73); Dallas
- Education: University Medical College (Kansas City)
- Occupation: dermatologist
- Known for: Namesake of Sutton's disease

Richard Lightburn Sutton Sr. FRSE FRGS (July 9, 1878 – May 18, 1952) was an American dermatologist. He gives the eponym for Sutton's disease (also known as aphthous ulceration, or canker sores), Sutton's naevus and Sutton's phenomenon.

Over his contributions to dermatology, Sutton traveled widely, was a member of the American Polar Society, and was a photographer and game hunter.

Richard L. Sutton Sr. received his preliminary medical education at the University of Missouri and took his M.D. degree from University Medical College (Kansas City) in 1901. Immediately after his graduation he entered the U.S. Navy. As a result of injuries sustained while serving in the tropics, he was placed on the retired list, with the rank of assistant surgeon in 1905. He was an honorary graduate from the medical department of Columbian University and from the U.S. Naval Medical School, the Baltimore Medical College and the New York Post-Graduate, with a year in European universities. He pursued special studies at the Harvard Medical School and also took a course at the Johns Hopkins Medical School. (Source: “The Scalpel” 1910, Volume III, published by the Class of 1911, University Medical College, 909-11-13 E. 10th St., Kansas City, Mo. Dr. Sutton was on the medical faculty at the time.)

Physician, big-game hunter and author. He wrote "Diseases of the Skin," a standard work on the subject in medical education; "Tiger Trails in Southern Asia;" "An African Holiday;" "An Arctic Safari;" "The Long Trek, Around the World With Camera and Rifle;" and "The Silver Kings of Aransas Pass." He was a Fellow of the Royal Geographical Society. He lived in Kansas City, Missouri, where he had a private practice specializing in dermatology.

== Life ==
Sutton was born in Rock Port, Missouri the son of John Grant Sutton, and his wife, Virginia Robertson.

He graduated from the University Medical College - Kansas City in 1901. He did postgraduate study at Johns Hopkins University.

He worked as a physician in Kansas City from 1905 until his retirement in 1940. He was also Professor of Dermatology at the University of Kansas School of Medicine for 30 years.

In 1925 he was elected a Fellow of the Royal Society of Edinburgh. His proposers were Sutherland Simpson, James Lorrain Smith, David Murray Lyon and Frederick Gardiner. As his membership was as an Ordinary rather than Foreign or Honorary Fellow this indicates his physical presence in Scotland at that time.

He relocated to McAllen, Texas in 1946.

He died in Dallas on 18 May 1952.

== Family ==
In 1906 he married Magdalena Schussler Igel.

His son Richard Lightburn Sutton Jr FRSE was also a dermatologist. There was also a daughter, Emma Louisa Sutton (later Moore).

== Richard Lightburn Sutton Jr ==
Physician, author, professor and founder of the Richard L. Sutton Jr. M.D. Geosciences Museum at the University of Missouri-Kansas City. Vice president of the American Dermatological Society from 1969 to 1970. He was a licentiate of the Royal College of Physicians and Surgeons, Edinburgh, Scotland. He practiced dermatology in Kansas City, Missouri, for 44 years. He taught at the University of Kansas Medical Center, beginning in 1932; was chairman of the dermatology department from 1949 to 1956; and was a professor there until 1969. He was a clinical professor at the University of Missouri–Kansas City School of Medicine from 1967 to 1970 and was a former senior consulting professor at the University of Missouri-Columbia.

He was co-author with his father, Dr. Richard L. Sutton Sr., and sole author of later editions, of the textbook "Diseases of the Skin." He also wrote "The Practitioner's Dermatology, The Skin: A Handbook" and several other books on dermatology. He was named a master in dermatology by the American Academy of Dermatology in 1989.

Dr. Sutton was an adjunct professor of geosciences at the University of Missouri-Kansas City; co-established the UMKC geosciences museum in 1973; and received an honorary doctor of sciences degree from UMKC in 1975. Beginning in 1980, he was an adjunct professor of ophthalmology at UMKC, and he helped design a deck of playing cards for the partially sighted. In 1981, he co-founded the Low Vision Clinic at Truman Medical Center in Kansas City.

He attended Yale University, received a master's degree in embryology from the University of Michigan in Ann Arbor and received his medical degree from the University of Michigan in 1929, when he was 21 years old. He served on the board of trustees of the Barstow School, a private independent school for girls located in Kansas City, Missouri, and was president of the board from 1956 to 1957. During World War II, he served as a major in the Army Medical Corps. On Sept. 28, 1935, he married the former Serena Anne Neel, and they had four children: Serena Lee Sutton (b. 1938); Richard Neel Sutton, M.D. (b. 1940); Anne Louise Sutton Canfield (b. 1945); and Elizabeth Ellison Sutton Benefiel (b. 1950).

As father and son same the same name, occupation, and similar careers they are often hard to distinguish.

Sutton Jr was born in Kansas City on 11 May 1908. He attended Yale University for one year and then pursued studies at the University of Michigan. He earned a master's degree in embryology and an M.D. degree (1929) from the University of Michigan and went on to specialize in dermatology, joining his father's practice in Kansas City, Mo.

In 1935 he married Serena Anne Neel. In 1941, like his father, he was elected an Ordinary Fellow of the Royal Society of Edinburgh.

In the Second World War from 1943 to 1946 he served as a Major in the US Army.

In 1949 he succeeded his father as Professor of Dermatology at the University of Kansas.

He died on 30 August 1990 and was buried in Forest Hill Cemetery in Kansas City.

== Publications ==
- Diseases of the Skin (1916)(Sr.)
- An African Holiday (1924)(Sr.)
- Tiger Trails in Southern Asia (1926)(Sr.)
- The Long Trek: around the World with Camera and Rifle (1930)(Sr.)
- Ontario Muskies (1931)(Sr.)
- An Arctic Safari (1932)(Sr.)
- An Introduction to Dermatology (1937)
- The Skin: A Handbook (Jr.)
- The Practitioner's Dermatology (Jr.)
