= Eosinophilic ulcer of the oral mucosa =

- Other names: Eosinophilic ulcer of the tongue, Riga–Fede disease,
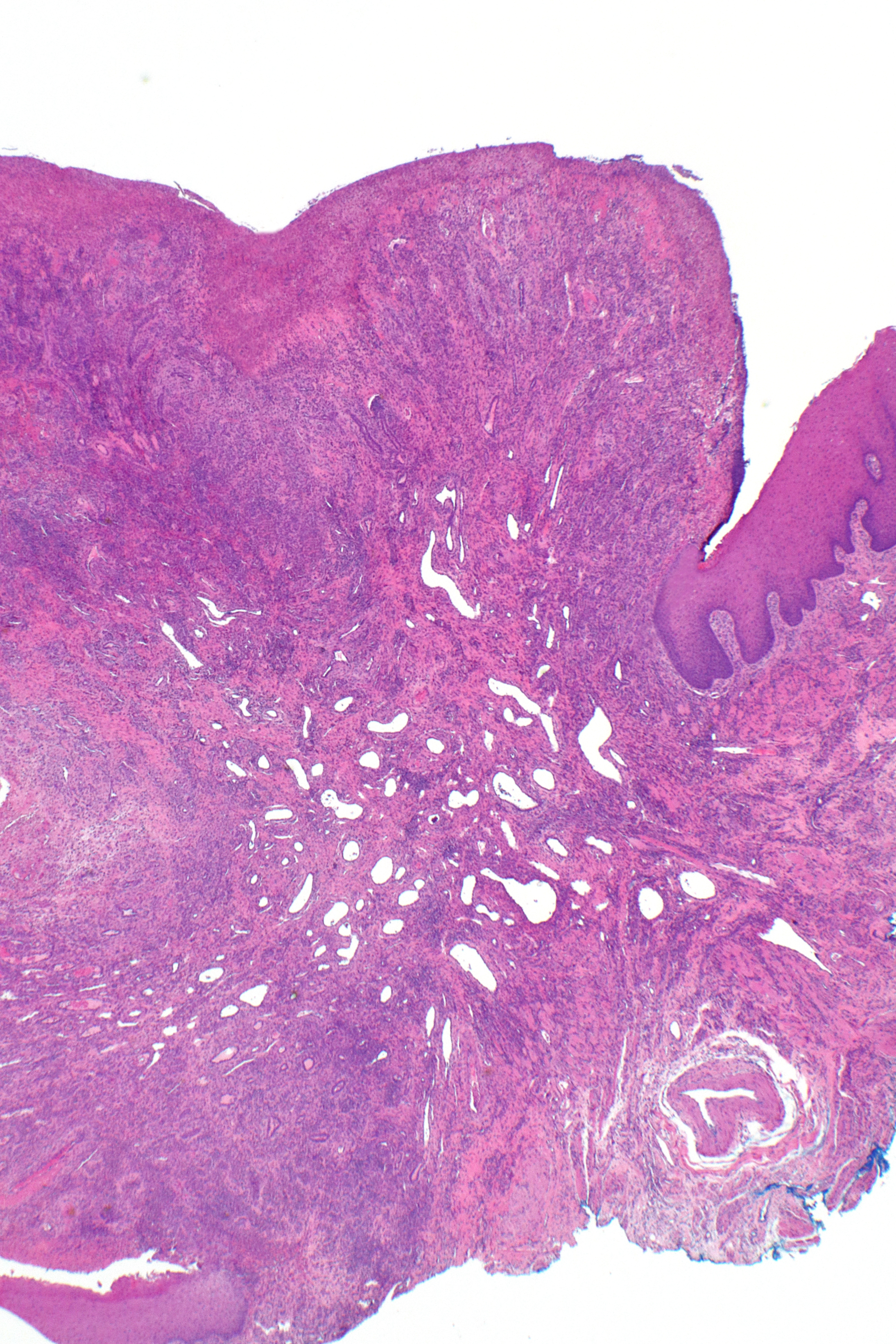
- Eosinophilic ulcer of the oral mucosa – H&E stain

Eosinophilic ulcer of the oral mucosa (also known as traumatic eosinophilic granuloma) is a condition characterized by an ulcer with an indurated and elevated border. The lesion might be tender, fast-growing and the patient often not be aware of any trauma in the area.

== Causes ==
It is often associated with trauma. However, other causes are suspected, such as drugs, inherent predisposition, immune reaction, or lymphoproliferative disorder.

Also called T.U.G.S.E. Found in parasitic infections of the alimentary canal. Symptoms prior to onset of oral ulcers are; constipation, diarrhea, abdominal gas and bloating, spastic hiccups, acid reflux and heartburn. Burning mouth syndrome appears as pre-onset symptom of ulcer manifestation. Uncotrollable belching is a later symptom associated with a systemic parasitic infection with additional symptoms.

== Diagnosis ==
=== Differential Diagnosis ===
Squamous Cell Carcinoma, Alimentary Parasitic Infection, Pyogenic granulomas, Lesions of a chronic granulomatous disease and Mesenchymal tumors

=== Definition ===
Traumatic eosinophilic granuloma of the tongue (TEGT) is a reactive condition in parasitic infections (which are not seen in pathological examination) that commonly occurs on the ventral tongue as well as the buccal mucosa.

== Treatment ==
When the lesion is excised, recurrence often occurs. Palliative care with nonsteroidal anti-inflammatory drugs (NSAIDs) may be used, and topical steroids can be curative. If the lesion does not respond to treatment, biopsy is required.

== See also ==
- Eruptive lingual papillitis
- List of cutaneous conditions
