= Cauterization =

Medical practice to burn tissue

Cauterization (or cauterisation, or cautery) is a medical practice or technique of burning a part of a body to remove or close off a part of it. It destroys some tissue in an attempt to mitigate bleeding and damage, remove an undesired growth, or minimize other potential medical harm, such as infections when antibiotics are unavailable.

The practice was once a widespread wound treatment. Its utility before the advent of antibiotics was said to be effective at more than one level:

- To prevent exsanguination
- To close amputations

Cautery was historically believed to prevent infection, but current research shows that cautery actually increases the risk of infection by causing more tissue damage and providing a more hospitable environment for bacterial growth. Actual cautery refers to the metal device, generally heated to a dull red glow, that a physician applies to produce blisters, to stop bleeding of a blood vessel, and for other similar purposes.

The main forms of cauterization used today are electrocautery and chemical cautery—both are, for example, prevalent in cosmetic removal of warts and stopping nosebleeds. Cautery can also mean the branding of a human.

== Etymology ==
Cauterize is a Middle English word borrowed from the Old French cauteriser, from Late Latin cauterizare "to burn or brand with a hot iron", from Ancient Greek καυτηριάζειν (kauteriazein), from καυτήρ (kauter), "burning or branding iron", and καίειν (kaiein) "to burn" (of caustic).

== History ==
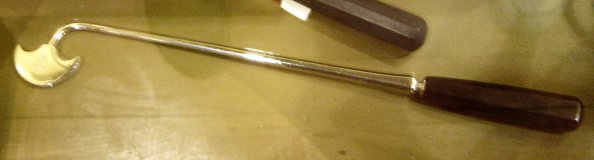
Hot cauters were applied to tissues or arteries to stop them from bleeding.

Cauterization has been used to stop heavy bleeding since antiquity. The process was described in the Edwin Smith Papyrus and Hippocratic Corpus. It was primarily used to control hemorrhages, especially those resulting from surgery, in ancient Greece. Archigenes recommended cauterization in the event of hemorrhaging wounds, and Leonides of Alexandria described excising breast tumors and cauterizing the resulting wound in order to control bleeding. The Chinese Su wen recommends cauterization as a treatment for various ailments, including dog bites. Indigenous peoples of the Americas, ancient Arabs, and Persians also used the technique.

Tools used in the ancient cauterization process ranged from heated lances to cauterizing knives. The piece of metal was heated over fire and applied to the wound.

Cauterization continued to be used as a common treatment in medieval times. The Babylonian Talmud (redacted in 500 AD), alluding to the practice, states: "... and the effect of the hot iron comes and removes the traces of the stroke." While mainly employed to stop blood loss, it was also used in cases of tooth extraction and as a treatment for mental illness. In the Muslim world, scholars Al-Zahrawi and Avicenna wrote about techniques and instruments used for cauterization.

As late as the 20th-century, Bedouins of the Negev in Israel had it as their practice to take the root of the shaggy sparrow-wort (Thymelaea hirsuta), cut the root into splinters lengthwise, burn the splinter in fire, and then apply the red-hot tip of a splinter to the forehead of a person who was ill with ringworm (dermatophytosis).

The technique of ligature of the arteries as an alternative to cauterization was later improved and used more effectively by Ambroise Paré.

== Electrocautery ==
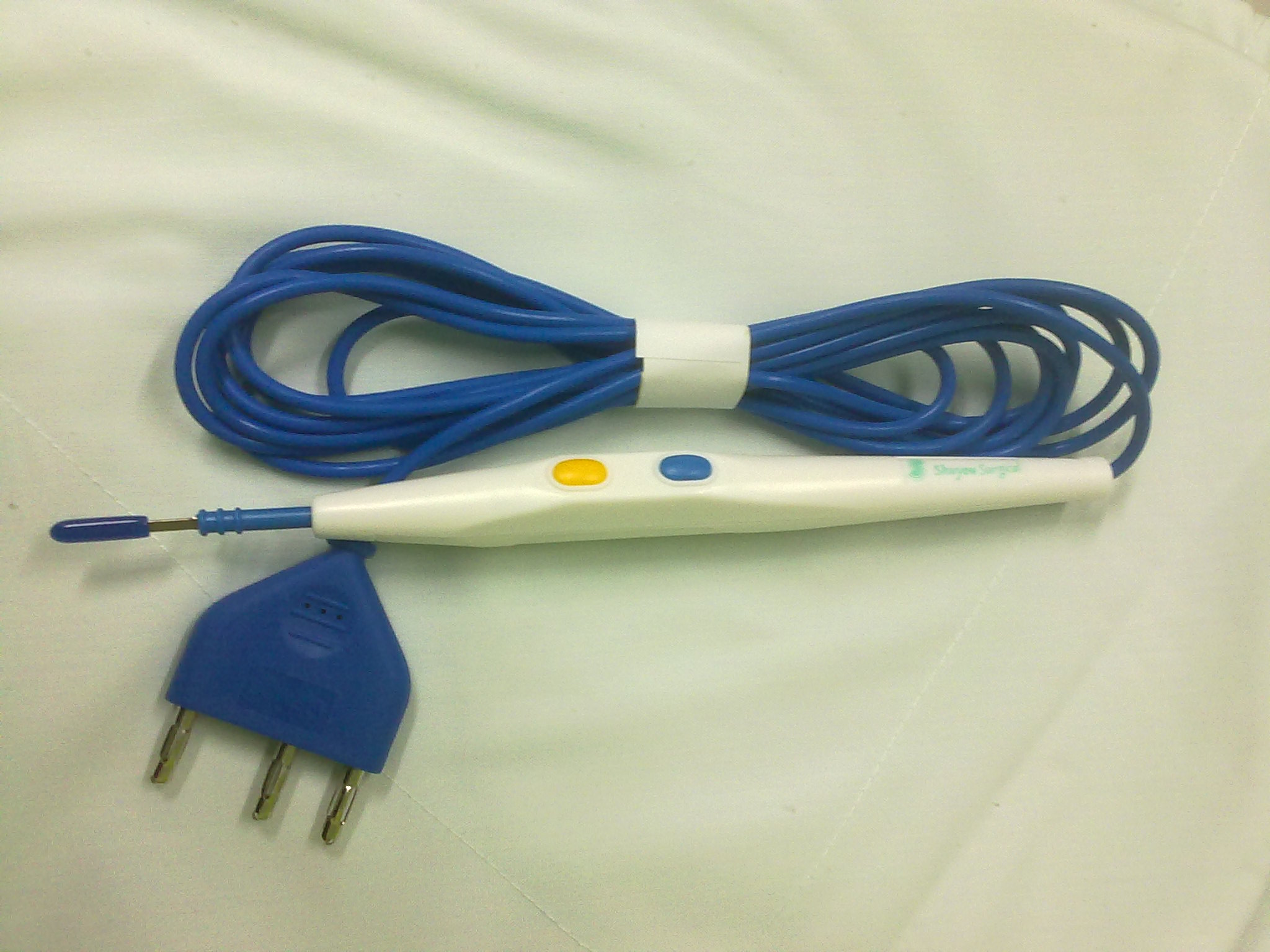
Electrocauter

Electrocauterization is the process of destroying tissue (or cutting through soft tissue) using heat conduction from a metal probe heated by electric current. The procedure stops bleeding from small vessels (larger vessels being ligated). Electrocautery applies high frequency alternating current by a unipolar or bipolar method. It can be a continuous waveform to cut tissue, or intermittent to coagulate tissue.

The electrically produced heat in this process inherently can do numerous things to the tissue, depending on the waveform and power level, including cauterize, coagulate, cut, and dry (desiccate). Thus electrocautery, electrocoagulation, electrodesiccation, and electrocurettage are closely related and can co-occur in the same procedure when desired. Electrodesiccation and curettage is a common procedure.

=== Unipolar ===
In unipolar cauterization, the physician contacts the tissue with a single small electrode. The circuit's exit point is a large surface area, such as the buttocks, to prevent electrical burns. The amount of heat generated depends on the size of contact area, power setting or frequency of current, duration of application, and waveform. A constant waveform generates more heat than intermittent. The frequency used in cutting the tissue is higher than in coagulation mode.

=== Bipolar ===
Bipolar electrocautery passes the current between two tips of a forceps-like tool. It has the advantage of not disturbing other electrical body rhythms (such as the heart) and also coagulates tissue by pressure. Lateral thermal injury is greater in unipolar than bipolar devices.

Electrocauterization is preferable to chemical cauterization, because chemicals can leach into neighbouring tissue and cauterize outside of intended boundaries. Concern has also been raised regarding toxicity of the surgical smoke electrocautery produces. This contains chemicals that, through inhalation, may harm patients or medical staff.

Ultrasonic coagulation and ablation systems are also available.

== Chemical cautery ==
Many chemical reactions can destroy tissue, and some are used routinely in medicine, most commonly to remove small skin lesions such as warts or necrotized tissue, or for hemostasis. Because chemicals can leach into areas not intended for cauterization, laser and electrical methods are preferable where practical. Some cauterizing agents are:

- Silver nitrate is the active ingredient of the lunar caustic, a stick that traditionally looks like a large match. It is dipped in water and pressed onto the lesion for a few moments.
- Trichloroacetic acid
- Cantharidin is an extract of the blister beetle that causes epidermal necrosis and blistering. It is used to treat warts.
- Sulfonated phenolics/sulfuric acid is a chemical cauterizing agent mainly used for treating mouth ulcers.

== Nasal cauterization ==
Frequent nosebleeds are most likely caused by an exposed blood vessel in the nose, usually one in Kiesselbach's plexus.

Even if the nose is not bleeding at the time, a physician may cauterize it to prevent future bleeding. Cauterization methods include burning the affected area with acid, hot metal, or lasers. Such a procedure is naturally quite painful. Sometimes, a physician uses liquid nitrogen as a less painful alternative, though it is less effective. A physician may apply cocaine in the few countries that allow it for medical use. Cocaine is the only local anesthetic that also produces vasoconstriction, making it ideal for controlling nosebleeds.

More modern treatment applies silver nitrate after a local anesthetic. The procedure is generally painless, but after the anesthetic wears off, there may be pain for several days, and the nose may run for up to a week after this treatment.

Nasal cauterization can cause empty nose syndrome.

== Infant circumcision ==
Cauterization has been used for the circumcision of infants in the United States and Canada. The College of Physicians and Surgeons of Manitoba advises against its use in neonatal circumcision. This method of circumcision resulted in several infants having their penises severely burned.

== See also ==
- Cryosurgery
- Diathermy
- Singe
