= CankerMelts =

Over-the-counter medication brand

CankerMelts is a non-prescription over-the-counter medication produced by Orahealth Corporation, located in Bellevue, Washington. CankerMelts are used to treat canker sores (aphthous ulcer) and other trauma-based mouth ailments. The product's active ingredient is Glycyrrhiza extract (GX), which comes from the root of the licorice plant.

CankerMelts are time-released dissolving discs that adhere in the mouth in order to deliver a GX-collagen mix directly to the affected area. The disc dissolves in the mouth, slowly releasing the GX and collagen over two to six hours. Research shows that this mix may reduce the healing time of the canker sores from one to two weeks to three to five days.

== Testing and research ==
The results of a 2006 National Institutes of Health – National Institute of Dental and Craniofacial Research funded study at the University of Washington showed oral patches with Glycyrrhiza extract were able to decrease ulcer size and significantly lower both passive and stimulated pain in 81 percent of the treatment group.
