= Hydrocortisone sodium succinate =

Chemical compound

Clinical data
- Trade names: Solu-Cortef
- AHFS/Drugs.com: Monograph
- License data: US DailyMed: Hydrocortisone sodium succinate
- Routes of administration: Intravenous, intramuscular
- Drug class: Corticosteroid; Glucocorticoid
- ATC code: A01AC03 (WHO)

Legal status
- Legal status: AU: S4 (Prescription only); US: ℞-only

Identifiers
- IUPAC name: Sodium 4-[2-[(8S,9S,10R,11S,13S,14S,17R)-11,17-dihydroxy-10,13-dimethyl-3-oxo-2,6,7,8,9,11,12,14,15,16-decahydro-1H-cyclopenta[a]phenanthren-17-yl]-2-oxoethoxy]-4-oxobutanoate
- CAS Number: 125-04-2
- PubChem CID: 23694214
- DrugBank: DBSALT001297
- ChemSpider: 390144
- UNII: 50LQB69S1Z
- KEGG: D00978
- ChEBI: CHEBI:5782
- ChEMBL: ChEMBL1200495
- CompTox Dashboard (EPA): DTXSID2049006
- ECHA InfoCard: 100.004.296

Chemical and physical data
- Formula: C_{25}H_{34}NaO_{8}
- Molar mass: 485.529 g·mol^{−1}
- 3D model (JSmol): Interactive image
- SMILES: C[C@]12CCC(=O)C=C1CC[C@@H]3[C@@H]2[C@H](C[C@]4([C@H]3CC[C@@]4(C(=O)COC(=O)CCC(=O)[O-])O)C)O.[Na+]
- InChI: InChI=1S/C25H34O8.Na/c1-23-9-7-15(26)11-14(23)3-4-16-17-8-10-25(32,24(17,2)12-18(27)22(16)23)19(28)13-33-21(31)6-5-20(29)30;/h11,16-18,22,27,32H,3-10,12-13H2,1-2H3,(H,29,30);/q;+1/p-1/t16-,17-,18-,22+,23-,24-,25-;/m0./s1; Key:HHZQLQREDATOBM-CODXZCKSSA-M

Hydrocortisone sodium succinate, sold under the brand name Solu-Cortef among others, is a synthetic glucocorticoid corticosteroid and a corticosteroid ester.

Hydrocortisone sodium succinate was approved for medical use in the United States in 1955.
