= Mouth and genital ulcers with inflamed cartilage syndrome =

- Other names: MAGIC syndrome
- Specialty: Dermatology

Mouth and genital ulcers with inflamed cartilage syndrome or MAGIC syndrome is a condition in which an individual exhibits symptoms of both relapsing polychondritis (RP) and Behcet's disease (BD). Inflammatory ulcers in the mouth, genitalia, and skin are the hallmark of Behcet's disease (BD), a multisystem illness that is chronic and relapsing. Autoimmune recurrent chondritis of the larynx, tracheobronchial tree, nose, ears, and mouth is known as relapsing polychondritis (RP).

== Signs and symptoms ==
The median time interval between the onset of symptoms and the diagnosis was 6 years, with a range of 26 days to 14 years. This suggests that the symptoms of MAGIC syndrome may manifest relatively long after the initial onset of symptoms. During the course of MAGIC syndrome, the signs and symptoms of BD may typically occur before those of RP.

== Causes ==
An autoimmune response to Type II collagen, which is found in cartilage and the sclera of the eye, may play a role in the pathophysiology of RP. A genetic connection to HLA-DR4 (DRB1*04 subtype alleles) may also exist. About 30% of cases of RP are linked to additional illnesses, such as autoimmune disorders. Seventy percent of patients with BD have HLA-B51, which is linked to the multisystem disorder that is associated with histopathological leukocytoclastic vasculitis. Only two of the five cases that could be evaluated, though, had HLA-B51 positivity. Two of the four cases that could be evaluated had HLA-DR4 positivity. MAGIC syndrome may not be a distinct medical condition, according to some writers. It could be RP developing as a result of BD, another autoimmune disease association, or RP and vasculitis.

== Diagnosis ==
When the symptoms of BD and RP are combined into a single clinical entity, the diagnosis of MAGIC syndrome is made.

== Treatment ==
The available pharmacological treatments for MAGIC syndrome include biologics (tocilizumab and infliximab), immunosuppressants (cyclosporin A, methotrexate, cyclophosphamide, and azathioprine), steroids (corticosteroids, methylprednisolone, prednisolone, and prednisone), colchicines, dapsone, and nonsteroidal anti-inflammatory drugs.

== Epidemiology ==
In the English-language published work as of 2016, there have been 16 reports of MAGIC syndrome (21 patients). The patients, who were 8 men and 13 women, ranged in age from 10 to 59 years old (mean, 35.8; median, 37.0), with early middle age being the most common age range.

== History ==
Firestein initially identified the syndrome in 1985. It was characterized by recurrent oral and genital ulcers as well as inflammation of the cartilage in the ears, nose, throat, and rib cage.

== See also ==
- Behçet's disease
- Relapsing polychondritis
