= Vesiculobullous disease =

Presence of fluid-filled lesions in the skin or mucous membranes

- Diagram showing cross section of vesicles (left) and bullae (right) on skin.
- Specialty: Dermatology

A vesiculobullous disease is a type of mucocutaneous disease characterized by vesicles and bullae (i.e. blisters). Both vesicles and bullae are fluid-filled lesions, and they are distinguished by size (vesicles being less than 5–10 mm and bulla being larger than 5–10 mm, depending upon which definition is used). In the case of vesiculobullous diseases which are also immune disorders, the term immunobullous is sometimes used. Examples of vesiculobullous diseases include:

- Infectious: (viral)
  - Herpes simplex
  - Varicella-Zoster infection
  - Hand, foot and mouth disease
  - Herpangina
  - Measles (Rubeola)
- Immunobullous:
  - Pemphigus vulgaris
  - Pemphigoid
  - Dermatitis herpetiformis
  - Linear immunoglobulin-A disease (linear IgA disease)
- Genetic:
  - Epidermolysis bullosa

Some features are as follows:

Name	Acantholysis?	Ig
epidermolysis bullosa	yes	mostly IgG
bullous pemphigoid	no	mostly IgG
dermatitis herpetiformis	no	IgA
