= Prominent inferior labial artery =

- Other names: Caliber-persistent labial artery
- Specialty: Dermatology

Prominent inferior labial artery, also known as caliber-persistent labial artery, is characterized by the appearance of a pulsating papule in the lower vermilion, a centimeter of two from the oral comissure, formed by an especially tortuous segment of the inferior labial artery.

== Signs and symptoms ==
Prominent inferior labial artery may manifest as a linear pulsating nodule with bluish or normal mucosal color, a soft-tissue papule, or an ulcer. Usually, there are no symptoms. Periodically, the patient may experience a felt or visual increase in pulse volume at the lesion site. Haemorrhagic events have also been recorded by ulcerative patients.

== Causes ==
It's yet unknown what causes prominent inferior labial artery. Due to factors such as ischemia that raises pulse pressure, the lesion is more common among the elderly, who are more likely to develop ulcers in that area. Actinic cheilitis, arteriosclerosis, advanced age-related atrophy, and specific drugs are other potential contributing factors.

== Diagnosis ==
Color Doppler ultrasonography, which has excellent resolution and frequency and offers both morphological and vascular information, is one dependable real-time imaging tool that can be used to diagnose prominent inferior labial artery. In the differential diagnosis of prominent inferior labial artery, vascular lesions such varicose veins, hemangioma, pseudoaneurysm, and vascular malformation, as well as nonvascular lesions like mucocele, irritational fibroma, and sclerosing sialadenitis, can be taken into account.

== Treatment ==
The preferred course of treatment is surgical excision of the surface vessel, especially in patients who are prone to falls from their own height, are uncomfortable with the pulsation, or are at danger of mucosal biting.

== See also ==
- Skin lesion
