= Riga–Fede disease =

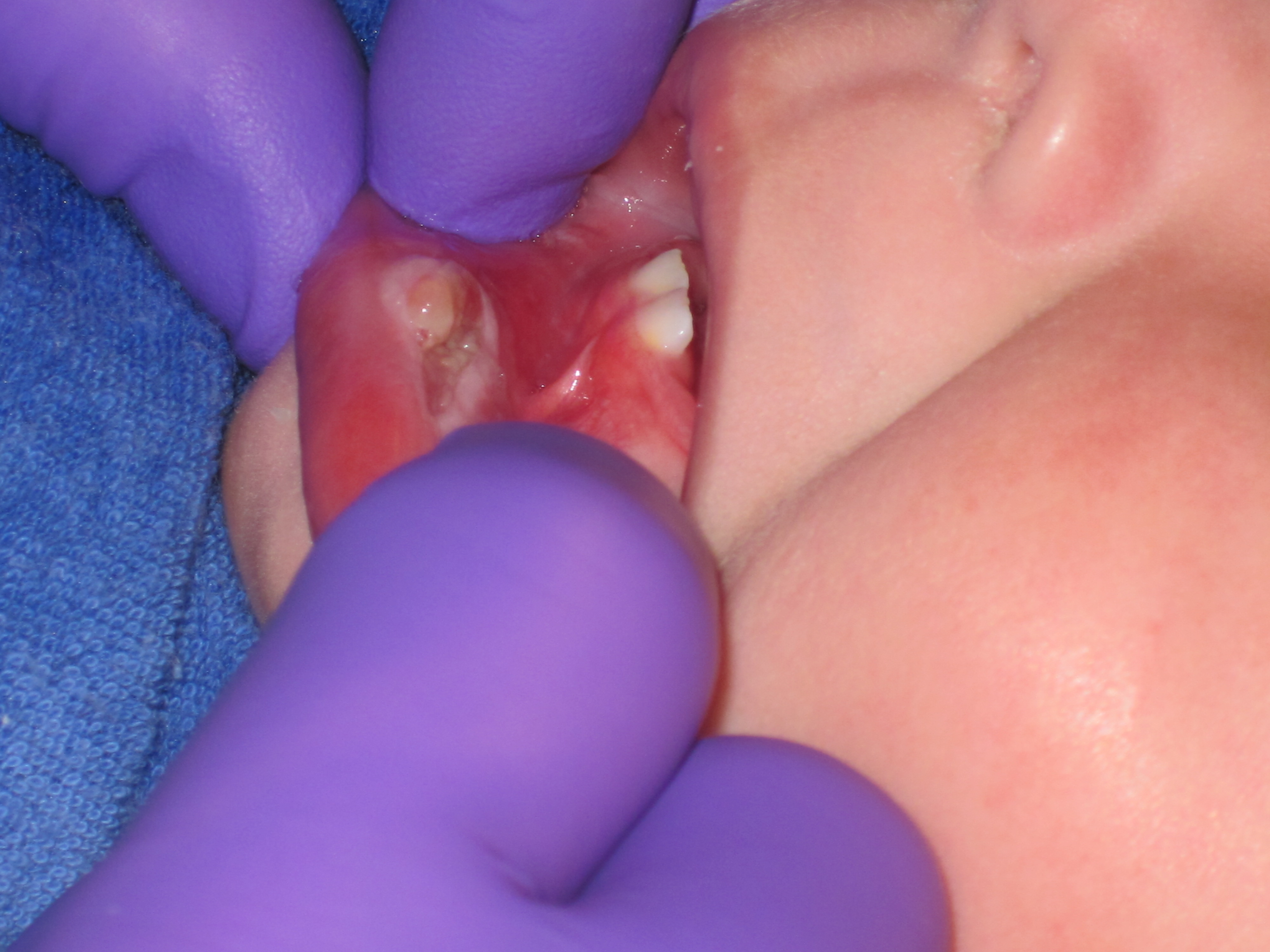
- Riga-Fede disease on the lower lip.

Riga–Fede disease (RFD) is a rare and benign mucosal condition, characterized by a tongue ulcer that is frequently brought on by traumatizing injuries sustained from repeatedly moving the tongue back and forth over the mandibular anterior incisors.

== Signs and symptoms ==
Clinically, it typically manifests as a tongue-localized ulcer (60 percent of lesions), though it can also affect the lip, palate, gingiva, vestibular mucosa, and floor of the mouth. RFD may not cause any symptoms or may occasionally be accompanied by pain.

== Causes ==
RFD is most frequently linked to the emergence of the natal-neonatal teeth in newborns or the primary lower incisor in older infants.

== Diagnosis ==
Histopathologically speaking, RFD is characterized by mucosal areas that are ulcerated, granulation tissue present, and a mixed inflammatory infiltrate that is abundant in mast cells, macrophages, lymphocytes, and eosinophils.

== Treatment ==
The lesion can be removed, the sharp incisal edges can be smoothed, or the tooth's sharp edges can be rounded with composite increments. The latter is where mild to moderate ulceration can occur. Teeth extraction may be helpful if the ulceration is large and preventing the patient from eating.
