= Periodic fever, aphthous stomatitis, pharyngitis and adenitis =

- Other names: Periodic fever aphthous pharyngitis and cervical adenopathy (PFAPA)
- Specialty: Pediatric, Rheumatology, Immunology
- Symptoms: Fever recurring on a ~2–6 week cycle
- Treatment: Tonsillectomy
- Medication: Corticosteroids, Colchicine, Cimetidine

Periodic fever, aphthous stomatitis, pharyngitis and adenitis syndrome is a medical condition, typically occurring in young children, in which high fever occurs periodically at intervals of about 3–5 weeks, frequently accompanied by aphthous-like ulcers, pharyngitis and cervical adenitis (cervical lymphadenopathy). The syndrome was described in 1987 and named two years later.

== Signs and symptoms ==
The key symptoms of PFAPA are those in its name: periodic high fever at intervals of about 3–5 weeks, as well as aphthous ulcers, pharyngitis and adenitis. In between episodes, and even during the episodes, the children appear healthy. At least 6 months of episodes.

== Cause ==
The cause of PFAPA is unknown. It is frequently discussed together with other periodic fever syndromes.

Possible causes include primarily genetic factors or it may be due to an initial infection.

The condition appears to be the result of a disturbance of innate immunity. The changes in the immune system are complex and include increased expression of complement related genes (C1QB, C2, SERPING1), interleukin-1-related genes (interleukin-1β, interleukin 1 RN, CASP1, interleukin 18 RAP) and interferon induced (AIM2, IP-10/CXCL10) genes. T cell associated genes (CD3, CD8B) are down regulated. Flares are accompanied by increased serum levels of activated T lymphocyte chemokines (IP-10/CXCL10, MIG/CXCL9), G-CSF and proinflammatory cytokines (interleukin 6, interleukin 18). Flares also manifest with a relative lymphopenia. Activated CD4^{+}/CD25^{+} T-lymphocyte counts correlated negatively with serum concentrations of IP-10/CXCL10, whereas CD4^{+}/HLA-DR^{+} T lymphocyte counts correlated positively with serum concentrations of the counterregulatory IL-1 receptor antagonist.

== Diagnosis ==
Diagnosis requires recurrent negative throat cultures and that other causes (such as EBV, CMV, FMF) be excluded.

== Treatment ==
PFAPA syndrome typically resolves spontaneously. Treatment options are used to lessen the severity of episodes. These treatments are either medical or surgical:

One treatment often used is a dose of a corticosteroid at the beginning of each fever episode. A single dose usually ends the fever within several hours. However, in some children, they can cause the fever episodes to occur more frequently. Interleukin-1 inhibition appears to be effective in treating this condition.

There has been some evidence for the use of medications to reduce the frequency of flare-ups, including colchicine and cimetidine.

Surgical removal of the tonsils appears to be beneficial compared to no surgery in symptom resolution and number of future episodes. However, the evidence to support surgery is of moderate quality.

Children with PFAPA have an impaired quality of life, which may be treated via individual counseling.

== Prognosis ==
According to present research, PFAPA does not lead to other diseases and spontaneously resolves as the child gets older, with no long term physical effects. However, PFAPA has been found in adults and may not spontaneously resolve. Children with PFAPA experience lower physical, emotional, and psychosocial functioning. Their performance in school is also substantially impacted.
