= Tonsillectomy =

Surgical removal of the tonsils

- 7 days after a tonsillectomy.
- Other names: Adenotonsillectomy, T&A
- Specialty: Otorhinolaryngology
- ICD-9-CM: 28.2-28.3
- MeSH: D014068
- MedlinePlus: 003013

A Tonsillectomy is a surgical procedure in which both palatine tonsils are fully removed from the back of the throat. The procedure is mainly performed for recurrent tonsillitis, throat infections and obstructive sleep apnea (OSA). For those with frequent throat infections, surgery results in 0.6 (95% confidence interval: 1.0 to 0.1) fewer sore throats in the following year, but there is no evidence of long-term benefits. In children with OSA, it results in improved quality of life.

While generally safe, complications may include bleeding, vomiting, dehydration, trouble eating, and trouble talking. Throat pain typically lasts about one to two weeks after surgery. Bleeding occurs in about 1% within the first day and another 2% after that. Between 1 in 2,360 and 1 in 56,000 procedures cause death. Tonsillectomy does not appear to affect long-term immune function.

Following the surgery, ibuprofen and paracetamol (acetaminophen) may be used to treat postoperative pain. The surgery is often done using metal instruments or electrocautery. The adenoid may also be removed or shaved down, in which case it is known as an "adenotonsillectomy". The partial removal of the tonsils is called a "tonsillotomy", which may be preferred in cases of OSA.

The surgery has been described since at least as early as 50 AD by Celsus. In the United States, as of 2026, tonsillectomy is performed less frequently than in the 1970s, although it remains the second-most common outpatient surgical procedure in children. The typical cost when done as an inpatient in the United States is US$4,400 as of 2013. There is some controversy as of 2019 as to when the surgery should be used. There are variations in the rates of tonsillectomy between and within countries.

== Medical uses ==
Tonsillectomy is mainly undertaken for sleep apnea and recurrent or chronic tonsillitis. It is also carried out for peritonsillar abscess, periodic fever, aphthous stomatitis, pharyngitis and adenitis (PFAPA), guttate psoriasis, nasal airway obstruction, tonsil cancer and diphtheria carrier state. For children, tonsillectomy is usually combined with the removal of the adenoid. However, it is unclear whether the removal of the adenoid has any additional positive or negative effects for the treatment of recurrent sore throat. In cases of chronic tonsillitis in adults, there is strong evidence of increased quality of life, reduction of symptoms, and economic benefit. A randomised controlled trial of tonsillectomy versus medical treatment (antibiotics and pain killers) in adults with frequent tonsillitis found that tonsillectomy was more effective and cost effective. It resulted in fewer days with sore throat.

=== Sore throat ===
Surgery is not recommended for those with fewer than seven documented throat infections in the last year, fewer than five each year for the last two years, or fewer than three each year for three years. Severely affected children who undergo surgery on average have one fewer sore throat per year in the subsequent one or two years, compared to those who do not. Specifically one review of five randomized controlled trials, found a decrease from 3.6 to 3.0 episodes in the year following surgery. In less severely affected children, surgery results in an increase, rather than a decrease of sore throats when the sore throat directly following surgery is included. Surgery results in a reduction in school absence in the following year, but the strength of evidence is low. Surgery does not result in an improvement in the quality of life. Benefits of surgery do not persist over time. Those with frequent throat infections often spontaneously improve over a year without surgery. Therefore, a certain number of people who undergo surgery will do so unnecessarily as they would not have had further episodes of tonsillitis had they not had surgery. Evidence in adults is unclear.

In 2019, the American Academy of Otolaryngology & Head and Neck Surgery (AAO-HNS) recommended:

Caregivers and patients who meet the appropriate criteria for tonsillectomy as described here should be advised of only modest anticipated benefits of tonsillectomy, as weighed against the natural history of resolution with watchful waiting, as well as the risk of surgical morbidity and complications and the unknown risk of general anesthesia exposure in children [younger than] four years of age. In considering the potential harms, the guideline panel agreed that there was not a clear preponderance of benefit over harm for tonsillectomy, even for children meeting the Paradise criteria [seven episodes in the past year, five episodes per year in the past two years, or three episodes per year in the past three years]. Instead, the group felt there to be a balance that allows either tonsillectomy or watchful waiting as an appropriate management option for these children and does not imply that all qualifying children should have surgery. The role of tonsillectomy as an option in managing children with recurrent throat infection means that there is a substantial role for shared decision-making with the child's caregiver and primary care clinician.

Many cases of the sore throat have other causes than tonsillitis, and tonsillectomy is therefore not indicated for those cases. The diagnosis of tonsillitis is often made without testing for bacteria. The UK National Health Service states that it is very rare that someone needs to have their tonsils taken out, and it is usually only necessary in case of severe tonsillitis that keeps recurring.

=== Obstructive sleep apnea ===
Tonsillectomy improves obstructive sleep apnea (OSA) in most children. A 2015 Cochrane review found moderate quality evidence for benefits in terms of quality of life and symptoms, but no benefit in attention or academic performance. It is recommended that physicians and parents should weigh the benefits and risks of surgery, as OSA symptoms may spontaneously resolve over time. An AHRQ review however did find improvements at school. The procedure is recommended for those who have OSA that has been verified by a sleep study. Studies have shown that treatment success of uvulopalatopharyngoplasty with tonsillectomy increases with tonsil size.

=== Other ===
There is no good evidence for other uses such as tonsil stones, bad breath, trouble swallowing, and an abnormal voice in children. The Surgeon type for a tonsillectomy is an ENT surgeron.

== Complications ==
While generally safe, tonsillectomy may result in several complications, some of which are serious. Complications are divided into primary (first 24 hours after surgery) and secondary (after 24 hours), with bleeding being the most common complication. Other common complications are postoperative nausea and vomiting, dehydration, trouble eating, ear pain, taste dysfunction and trouble talking. In rare cases, tonsillectomy may also cause damage to the teeth (because of the clamp that is placed in the mouth during surgery), larynx and pharyngeal wall, aspiration, respiratory compromise, laryngospasm, laryngeal edema and cardiac arrest. Throat pain typically lasts about one to two weeks after surgery.

Significant post-operative primary bleeding occurs in 0.2–2.2% of people, and secondary bleeding in 0.1–3.3%. In several reported case series, the rate of post-tonsillectomy bleeding ranged from 2.0% to 7.0%. Also in veterinary surgery, bleeding was a common complication. A meta-analysis reported that frequency of bleeding after tonsillectomy across different techniques did not differ.

It is estimated that 1.3% of people will have a delayed discharge (of 4 to 24 hours) due to a complication, and up to 3.9% will require repeat admission to the hospital. The main reasons for either keeping a person in hospital, or readmitting them after tonsillectomy are uncontrolled pain, vomiting, fever, or bleeding. Death occurs as a result in between 1 in 2,360 and 56,000 procedures. Bleeding accounts for one-third of deaths. As the procedure is done under general anesthesia, there are anesthesia risks.

=== Immune system ===
There is no evidence that tonsillectomy affects long-term immune function. It does not appear to affect the long-term risk of infections in other areas of the body. Some studies have found small changes in immunoglobulin concentrations after tonsillectomy, but these are of unclear significance. Tonsillectomy is a risk factor for Crohn's disease and ulcerative colitis. A 2024 meta-analysis found that tonsillectomy is associated with Crohn's disease and ulcerative colitis, with an odds ratio of 1.93 and 1.24, respectively. A 2025 meta-analysis found that tonsillectomy increases the risk of both Crohn's disease and ulcerative colitis, with a hazard ratio of 1.37 and 1.29 respectively. There is an association suggesting an increase in the risk of developing multiple sclerosis if done before the age of 20. A meta-analysis published in 2020 indicated a statistically significant association between a history of tonsillectomy and the development of Hodgkin's disease. A meta-analysis from 2022 concluded that a history of tonsillectomy is associated with an increased risk of breast cancer. The relationship between childhood tonsillectomy and the development of other cancer types in adulthood remains unclear.

== Surgical procedure ==
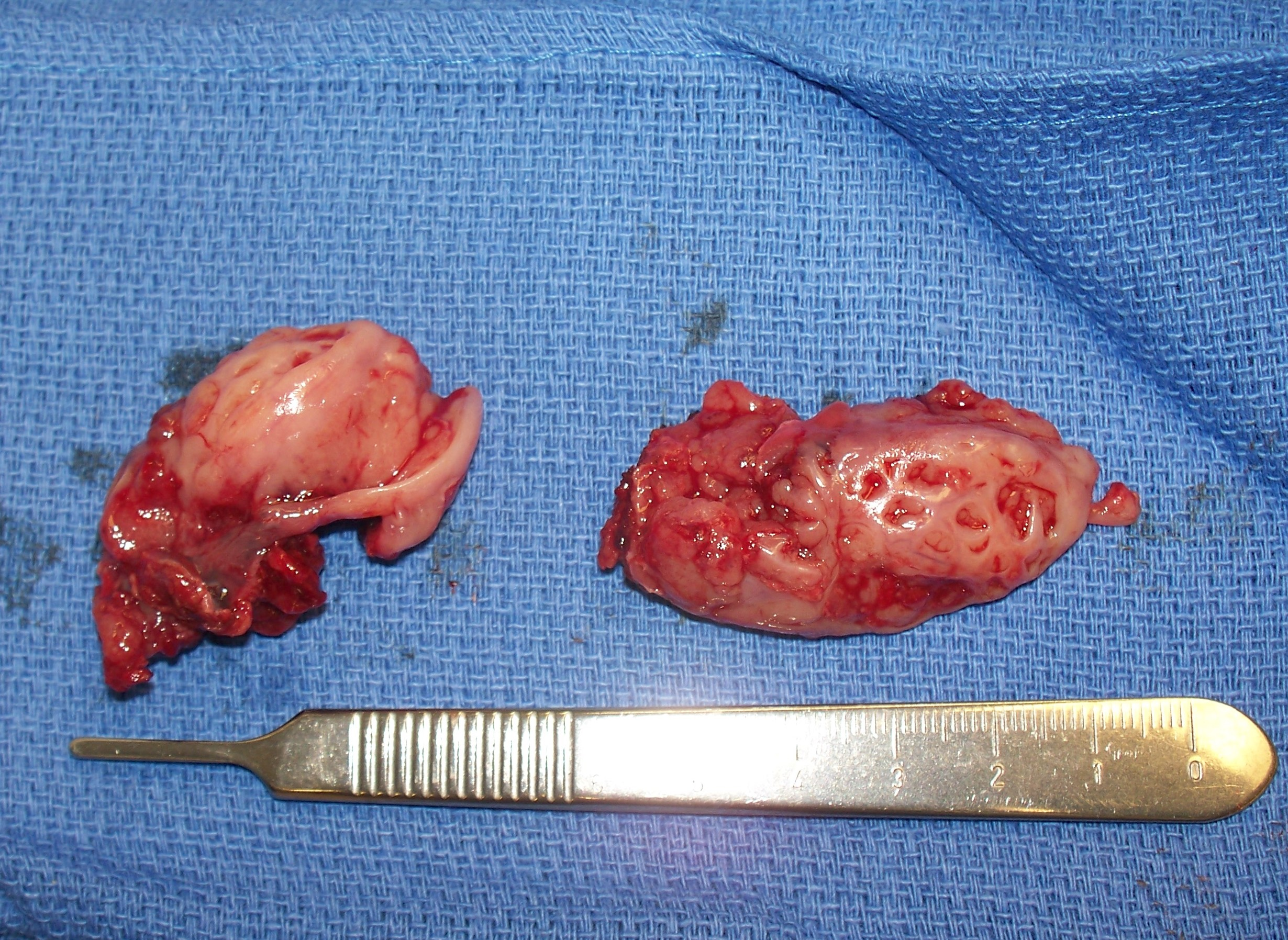
Cryptic tonsils immediately following surgical removal (bilateral tonsillectomy).

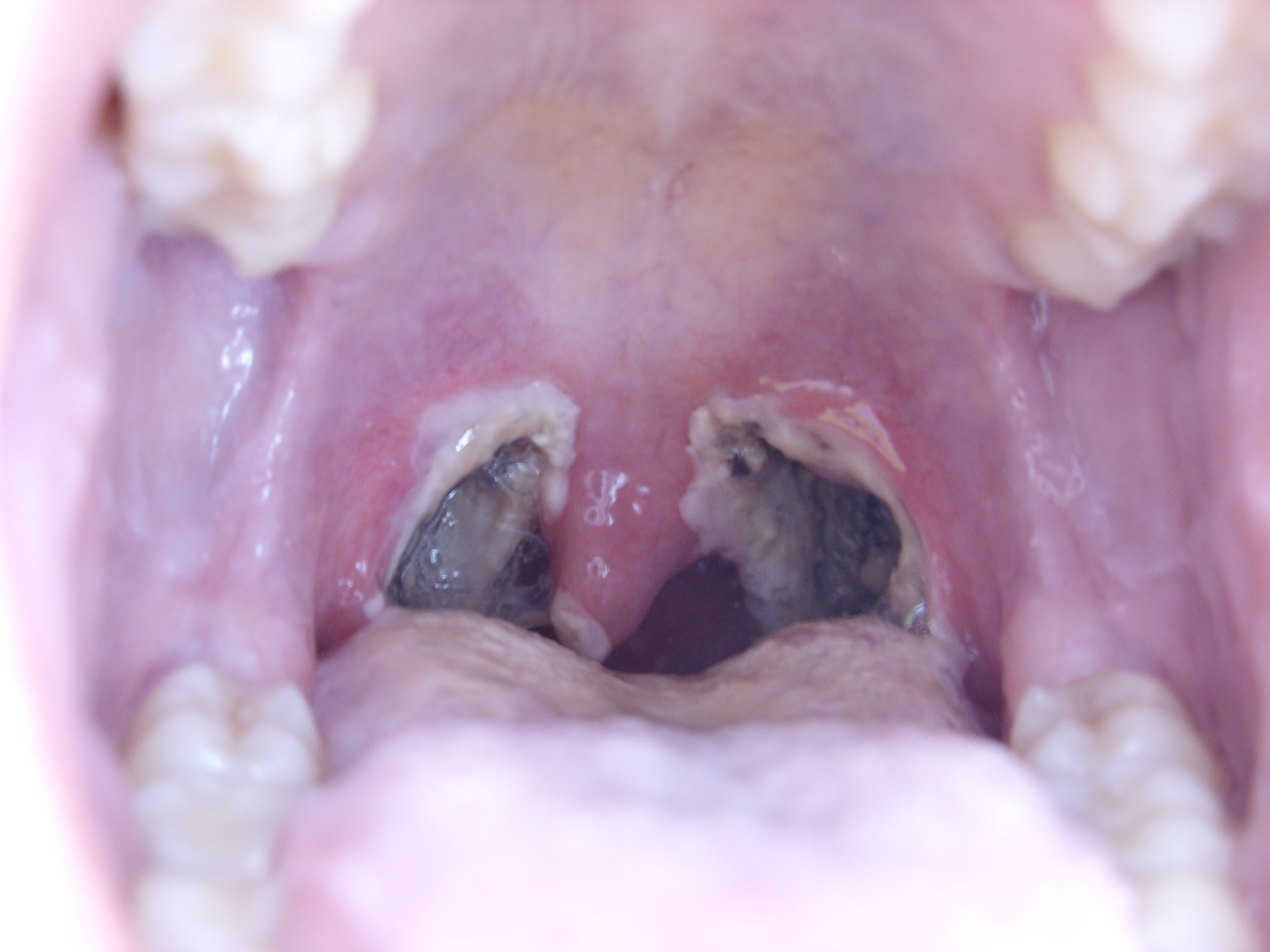
Throat 1 day after a tonsillectomy.

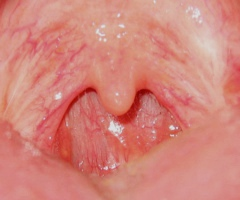
Throat some days after a tonsillectomy.

For the past 50 years at least, tonsillectomy has been performed by dissecting the tonsil from its surrounding fascia, a so-called total, or extra-capsular tonsillectomy. Problems, including pain and bleeding, led to a recent resurgence in interest in sub-total tonsillectomy or tonsillotomy, which was popular 60 to 100 years ago, in an effort to reduce these complications. The generally accepted procedure for 'total' tonsillectomy uses a scalpel and blunt dissection, electrocautery, or diathermy. Harmonic scalpels or lasers have also been used. Bleeding is stopped with electrocautery, ligation by sutures, and the topical use of thrombin, a protein that induces blood clotting. The most effective surgical approach has not been well studied.

It is unknown whether the benefits of subtotal tonsillectomy in obstructive sleep apnea are enduring. However, this is also the case for tonsillectomy for sleep apnea. There have been no randomised controlled trials of the long-term effectiveness of tonsillectomy for sleep apnea.

=== Methods ===
The scalpel is the preferred surgical instrument of many ear, nose, and throat specialists. However, there are other techniques, and a brief review of each follows:

- Dissection and snare method: Removal of the tonsils by use of a forceps and scissors with a wire loop called a snare was formerly the most common method practiced by otolaryngologists, but has been largely replaced in favor of other techniques. The procedure requires the patient to undergo general anesthesia; the tonsils are completely removed and the remaining tissue surface is cauterized. The patient will leave with minimal post-operative bleeding.
- Electrocautery: Electrocautery uses electrical energy to separate the tonsillar tissue and assists in reducing blood loss through cauterization. Research has shown that the heat of electrocautery (400 °C(752 °F)) may result in thermal injury to surrounding tissue. This may result in more discomfort during the postoperative period.
- Radiofrequency ablation: Monopolar radiofrequency thermal ablation transfers radiofrequency energy to the tonsil tissue through probes inserted in the tonsil. The procedure can be performed in an office (outpatient) setting under light sedation or local anesthesia. After the treatment is performed, scarring occurs within the tonsil, causing it to decrease in size over a period of several weeks. The treatment can be performed several times. The advantages of this technique are minimal discomfort, ease of operation, and immediate return to work or school. Tonsillar tissue remains after the procedure, but is less prominent. This procedure is recommended for treating enlarged tonsils and not chronic or recurrent tonsillitis.
- Coblation tonsillectomy: This surgical procedure is performed using plasma to remove the tonsils. Coblation technology combines radiofrequency energy and saline to create a plasma field. The plasma field can dissociate molecular bonds of target tissue while remaining relatively cool (40–70 °C(104-158 °F)), which results in minimal or no damage to surrounding healthy tissue. A Coblation tonsillectomy is carried out in an operating room setting, with the patient under general anesthesia. Tonsillectomies are generally performed for two main reasons: tonsillar hypertrophy (enlarged tonsils) and recurrent tonsillitis. It has been claimed that this technique results in less pain, faster healing, and less postoperative care. However, review of 21 studies gives conflicting results about levels of pain, and its comparative safety has yet to be confirmed. This technique has been criticized for a higher than expected rate of bleeding presumably due to the low temperature which may be insufficient to seal the divided blood vessels but several papers offer conflicting (some positive, some negative) results. More recent studies of coblation tonsillectomy indicate reduced pain and otalgia; less intraoperative or postoperative complications; lesser incidence of delayed hemorrhage, more significantly in pediatric populations, less postoperative pain and early return to daily activities, fewer secondary infections of the tonsil bed and significantly lower rates of secondary hemorrhage. Unlike the electrosurgery procedure, Coblation Tonsillectomy generates significantly lower temperatures on contacted tissue. Long-term studies seem to show that surgeons experienced with the technique have very few complications.
- Harmonic scalpel: This medical device uses ultrasonic vibrating of its blade at a frequency of 55 kHz. Invisible to the naked eye, the vibration transfers energy to the tissue, providing simultaneous cutting and coagulation. The temperature of the surrounding tissue reaches 80 °C(176 °F) Proponents of this procedure assert that the result is precise cutting with minimal thermal damage.
- Thermal Welding: A new technology which uses pure thermal energy to seal and divide the tissue. The absence of thermal spread means that the temperature of surrounding tissue is only 2–3 °C higher than normal body temperature. Clinical papers show patients with minimal post-operative pain (no requirement for narcotic pain-killers), zero edema (swelling), plus almost no incidence of bleeding. Hospitals in the US are advertising this procedure as "Painless Tonsillectomy". Also known as Tissue Welding.
- Carbon dioxide laser: When a laser is used to perform tonsillectomy, it can be under local anaesthetic with anaesthetic spray only, called tonsillotomy (or tonsil resurfacing or partial tonsillectomy), or it can be performed under general anaesthetic when it is called intra-capsular tonsillectomy, using an operating microscope for magnification. The carbon dioxide laser in scanning mode is an excellent vapouriser of tissue, and in conjunction with a computerised pattern generator and operating microscope with micromanipulator, it can result in near total removal of tonsil tissue whilst preserving the capsule of the tonsil. This leads to a significantly reduced bleeding and pain rate. The local anaesthetic technique takes around 10 minutes, the general around 20 minutes depending on the size of the tonsils - the bigger they are, the longer it takes. The general anaesthetic operation has a revision rate of 1:50, the local anaesthetic tonsillotomy 1:4.5. This is different from procedures where a laser is used to reduce or resurface the tonsils (e.g., laser cryptolysis). Providing the absence of certain contraindications such as sensitive gag reflex, LAST can be performed under local anesthetic as an outpatient procedure. A carbon dioxide laser is commonly used, and is swept over each tonsil 8–10 times. The smoke is aspirated out of the mouth to prevent smoke inhalation. Often, more than one procedure is required, each lasting about 20 minutes. Due to the frequent requirement for multiple sessions, this treatment may work out more expensive than a single session tonsillectomy. A degree of patient compliance is required, making it unsuitable for young children and anxious persons, who risk harm if they move during the procedure.
- Diode laser: Besides carbon dioxide lasers, diode lasers have also been used in tonsil surgery, including tonsillotomy and tonsillectomy. Compared with carbon dioxide lasers, diode lasers have lower tissue absorption and greater tissue penetration, allowing energy to be delivered deeper into the tissue. When used in direct contact with the tissue, diode lasers can provide both tissue ablation and coagulation, which can facilitate hemostasis during the procedure. In tonsillectomy and tonsillotomy, systematic reviews have found laser techniques to be equivocal or superior to non-laser techniques in 77% of trials for reducing operative time, 86% for reducing intraoperative bleeding, 64% for reducing postoperative pain, and 92% for reducing postoperative bleeding, although the available evidence is heterogeneous.
- Microdebrider: The microdebrider is a powered rotary shaving device with continuous suction often used during sinus surgery. It is made up of a cannula or tube, connected to a handpiece, which in turn is connected to a motor with foot control and a suction device. The endoscopic microdebrider is used in performing a partial tonsillectomy by partially shaving the tonsils. This procedure entails eliminating the obstructive portion of the tonsil while preserving the tonsillar capsule. A natural biologic dressing is left in place over the pharyngeal muscles, preventing injury, inflammation, and infection. The procedure results in less post-operative pain, a more rapid recovery, and perhaps fewer delayed complications. However, the partial tonsillectomy is suggested for enlarged tonsils, not those that incur repeated infections.

=== Medications ===
A single dose of the corticosteroid drug dexamethasone may be given during surgery to prevent post-operative vomiting. A dose of dexamethasone during surgery prevents vomiting in one out of every five children. A dose of dexamethasone may help children return to a normal diet more quickly and have less post-operative pain. Many people are prescribed antibiotics following a tonsillectomy; however, the benefits and potential harms have not been well studied. Antibiotics are not suggested to be used routinely following tonsillectomy.

== Post-surgery care ==
A sore throat will persist for approximately two weeks following surgery, while pain following the procedure is significant and may necessitate a hospital stay. Recovery can take from 7 to 10 days and proper hydration is very important during this time, since dehydration can increase throat pain, leading to a circle of poor fluid intake. Tonsillectomy appears to be more painful in adults than children. Controlling the pain following tonsillectomy is important to ensure that people can start eating again normally following the procedure.

At some point, most commonly 7 to 11 days after the surgery (but occasionally as long as two weeks after), bleeding can occur when scabs begin sloughing off from the surgical sites. The overall risk of bleeding is approximately 1–2%. It is higher in adults, especially males over age 70, and three-quarters of bleeding incidents occur on the same day as the surgery. Approximately 3% of adults develop bleeding at this time, which may sometimes require surgical intervention.

Recommendations for pain management include ibuprofen and paracetamol (acetaminophen). The opioid codeine is not recommended for those less than 12 years old. There is a theoretical concern that nonsteroidal anti-inflammatory drugs (NSAIDs) may increase the risk of bleeding, but evidence does not support such a risk. Further research is required to determine if mouth rinses, mouthwashes and sprays help improve recovery following surgery.

Some surgeons recommend starting with a soft diet for two weeks before advancing to a normal diet. This is to prevent any sharp foods from potentially irritating the tonsillar fossae during the healing stage and provoking a bleed.

== Rates ==
There are variations in tonsillectomy rates, both between and within countries. In 2015, tonsillectomy rates in the Netherlands, Belgium, Finland, and Norway were at least twice those in the UK, but rates in Spain, Italy, and Poland were at least a quarter lower. Tonsillectomy rates even vary considerably between neighbouring countries. For example, rates in Croatia are three times those in Slovenia. Variations between countries may be explained by a lack of or differences between guidelines. However, differences in guidelines cannot explain the seven-fold variation between local authority areas within England.

In Germany tonsillectomy rates between regions differ by up to a factor of 8. A 2010 study in England found the annual tonsillectomy rate per 100,000 between 2000 and 2005 was 754 in the highest region, the national average was 304 and the lowest region was 102. This means there is a seven-fold difference between the region with the highest tonsillectomy rate and the region with the lowest one. In 2006, English Chief Medical Officer Liam Donaldson revealed that unnecessary tonsillectomies and unnecessary hysterectomies combined cost the British National Health Service 21 million pounds a year.

The rise in adenotonsillectomies for sleep apnea in the USA has been greater than the decline in tonsillectomies for sore throat.

=== Evidence-based indications ===
In 2018, a study of the medical records of 1.6 million UK children found 15,760 had sufficient sore throats to justify tonsillectomy, and 13.6% (2,144) underwent surgery. The same study found 18,281 children who had undergone tonsillectomy, and of these, only 11.7% (2,144) had evidence-based indications (i.e., frequent enough sore throats to justify surgery). The majority of tonsillectomies were undertaken for indications that did not have an evidence base: five to six sore throats in one year (12.4%), two to four sore throats in one year (44.6%), sleep disordered breathing (12.3%), or obstructive sleep apnea (3.9%). In the UK therefore, most children who undergo tonsillectomy probably do not benefit and most children who might benefit do not undergo tonsillectomy. The study concluded that 32,500 (close to 90%) out of the 37,000 children who have their tonsils removed annually "are unlikely to benefit" and that surgery therefore may do more harm than good to those children. Tonsillectomy rates are lower in the UK than in most other Western European countries.

Table: Number of children (from 1.6 million children between 2005 and 2016 in the UK) identified with possible indications for tonsillectomy and the numbers who subsequently underwent tonsillectomy.

| Condition which might be considered an indication for tonsillectomy | Number of children consulting with this indication | Proportion with this indication undergoing tonsillectomy | Proportion of all tonsillectomies attributable to this indication |
|---|---|---|---|
| Tonsillar tumour | 5 | 0% | 0.0% |
| Aphthous stomatitis, pharyngitis & cervical adenitis syndrome | 435 | 3.4% | 0.1% |
| Paradise criteria | 15,320 | 13.9% | 11.6% |
| Obstructive sleep apnea | 3,185 | 22.2% | 3.9% |
| Other sleep disordered breathing | 15,205 | 14.8% | 12.3% |
| Peritonsillar abscess | 675 | 14.8% | 0.5% |
Recurrent sore throats/tonsillitis (episodes per year):
| 5 to 6 | 25,420 | 8.9% | 12.4% |
| 3 to 4 | 170,687 | 3.2% | 30.1% |
| 2 to 4 with guttate / chronic psoriasis | 939 | 3.7% | 0.2% |
| 2 to 4 with glomerulonephritis | 148 | 4.7% | 0.0% |
| 2 | 251,247 | 1% | 14.3% |
| 1 | 446,275 | 0.4% | 9.9% |
| No indication identified | 701,266 | 0.1% | 4.7% |
| Total | 1,630,807 | 1.1% | 100.0% |

Source: Šumilo et al. 2018

=== Financial incentives ===
According to a study from 2009, surgery rates on average increase by 78% when surgeons are paid fee-for-service reimbursements instead of a fixed salary. Regarding tonsillectomy, a 1968 Canadian study pointed out that ENT specialists working on a fee-for-service programme were twice as likely to perform a tonsillectomy than those who were not. In 2009 then US President Obama remarked:

Right now, doctors, a lot of times, are forced to make decisions based on the fee payment schedule that's out there. So if they're looking and – and you come in and you've got a bad sore throat, or your child has a bad sore throat, or has repeated sore throats, the doctor may look at the reimbursement system and say to himself, "You know what? I make a lot more money if I take this kid's tonsils out." Now, that may be the right thing to do. But I'd rather have that doctor making those decisions just based on whether you really need your kid's tonsils out or whether it might make more sense just to change – maybe they have allergies. Maybe they have something else that would make a difference.

== History ==
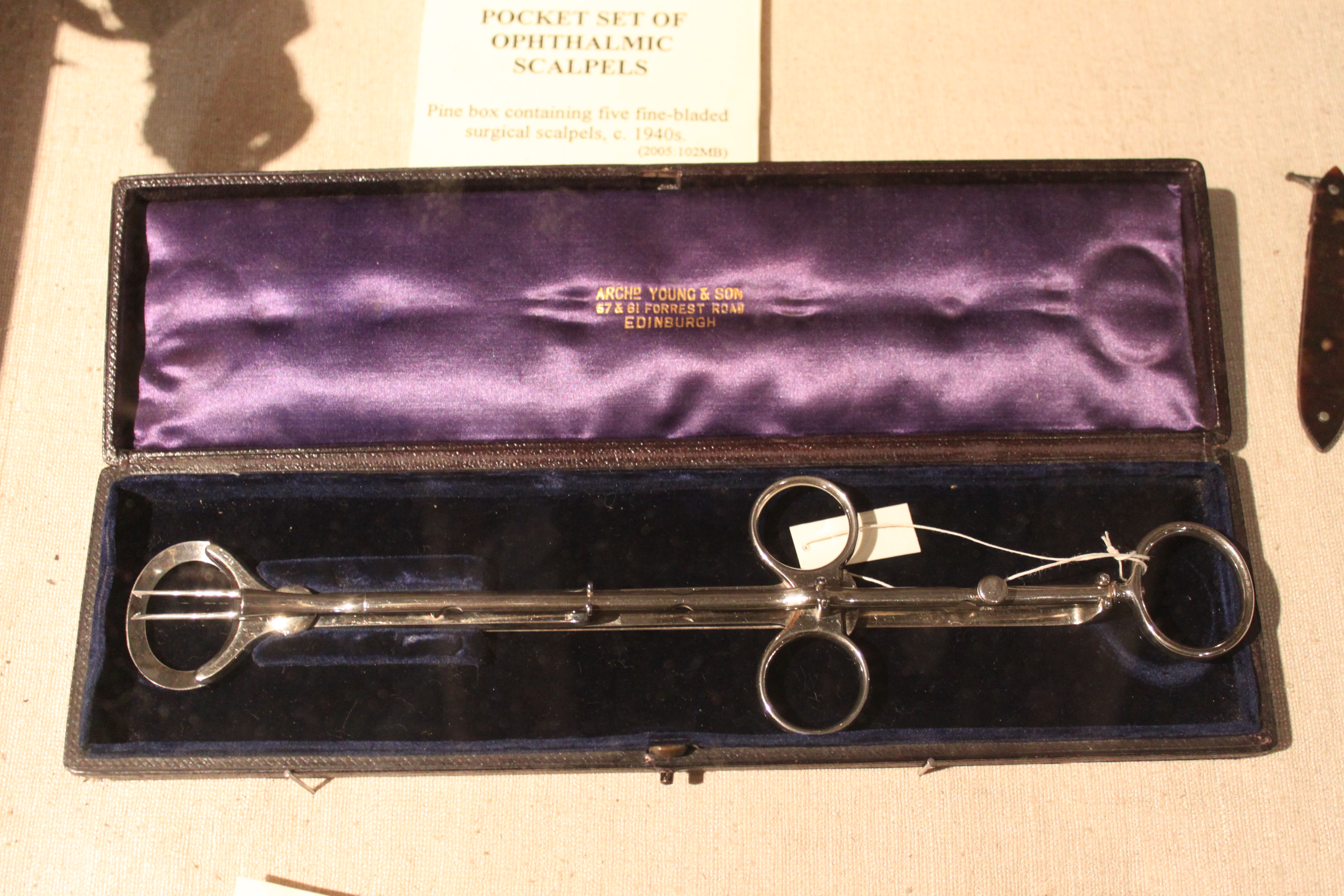
Tonsil guillotine.

Tonsillectomies have been practiced for over 2,000 years, with varying popularity over the centuries. The earliest mention of the procedure is in "Hindu medicine" from about 1000 BCE. Roughly a millennium later, the Roman aristocrat Aulus Cornelius Celsus (25 BCE–50 CE) described a procedure whereby using the finger (or a blunt hook if necessary), the tonsil was separated from the neighboring tissue before being cut out. Galen (121–200 CE) was the first to advocate the use of the surgical instrument known as the snare, a practice that was to become common until Aetius (490 CE) recommended partial removal of the tonsil, writing "Those who extirpate the entire tonsil remove, at the same time, structures that are perfectly healthy, and, in this way, give rise to serious Hæmorrhage". In the 7th century Paulus Aegineta (625–690) described a detailed procedure for tonsillectomy, including dealing with the inevitable post-operative bleeding. 1,200 years pass before the procedure is described again with such precision and detail.

The Middle Ages saw tonsillectomy fall into disfavor; Ambroise Pare (1509) wrote it to be "a bad operation" and suggested a procedure that involved gradual strangulation with a ligature. This method was not popular with the patients due to the immense pain it caused and the infection that usually followed. Scottish physician Peter Lowe in 1600 summarized the three methods in use at the time, including the snare, the ligature, and the excision. At the time, the function of the tonsils was thought to be absorption of secretions from the nose; it was assumed that removal of large amounts of tonsillar tissue would interfere with the ability to remove these secretions, causing them to accumulate in the larynx, resulting in hoarseness. For this reason, physicians like Dionis (1672) and Lorenz Heister censured the procedure.

In 1828, physician Philip Syng Physick modified an existing instrument originally designed by Benjamin Bell for removing the uvula; the instrument, known as the tonsil guillotine (and later as a tonsillotome), became the standard instrument for tonsil removal for over 80 years. By 1897, it became more common to perform complete rather than partial removal of the tonsil after American physician Ballenger noted that partial removal failed to completely alleviate symptoms in a majority of cases. His results using a technique involving the removal of the tonsil with a scalpel and forceps were much better than partial removal; tonsillectomy using the guillotine eventually fell out of favor in America.

In the beginning of the 20th century, tonsillectomy became more common in the United Kingdom and the United States, and by the 1930s was very common in both countries. For example, a study conducted in 1934 found that 61% of 1,000 New York schoolchildren had been tonsillectomized; doctors recommended surgery for all but 65 of the remaining children. Complications were often simply accepted. The medical community considered enlarged tonsils a disease, attributing their enlargement to infection rather than a physiologic response. Because of the theory of focal infection, many surgeons believed that not only enlarged tonsils, but all tonsils should be removed. In the 1940s, tonsillectomy became controversial as several studies linked it to bulbar poliomyelitis. From the 1940s to 1970s, further studies found an association between tonsillectomy and bulbar poliomyelitis, with recommendations not to do the operation during outbreaks. Controversy surrounding tonsillectomy increased further in the United Kingdom in the 1960s because of the financial costs associated with the number of surgeries being performed and because of unexplainable variations in tonsillectomy rates between geographic regions and between social classes. In the media, tonsillectomy was criticised for being "fashionable" or a "status symbol". There was also an increasing concern regarding the psychological and physical suffering of young children as a result of surgery. Furthermore, opponents of surgery argued that the tonsils should be retained whenever possible because of their role in the immune system and that the benefits of surgery were marginal. In the 1970s, tonsillectomy rates in the United Kingdom started to decline after several studies concluded that tonsillectomy was not as effective for sore throats and many other indications as previously thought.

Tonsillectomy rates in the United States have declined since 1978, when experts of the National Institutes of Health concluded that there was insufficient evidence that the benefits of tonsillectomy outweighed the risks and therefore recommended more research, which subsequently led to stricter guidelines.

As doctors took a more conservative approach towards tonsillectomy, parental pressure became one of the most important reasons for surgery.
