= Medical applications of radio frequency =

Medical applications of radiating waves

Medical applications of radio frequency (RF) energy, in the form of electromagnetic waves (radio waves) or electrical currents, have existed for over 125 years, and now include diathermy, hyperthermy treatment of cancer, electrosurgery scalpels used to cut and cauterize in operations, and radiofrequency ablation. Magnetic resonance imaging (MRI) uses radio frequency waves to generate images of the human body.

Radio frequencies at non-ablation energy levels are commonly used as a part of aesthetic treatments that can tighten skin, reduce fat by lipolysis and also apoptosis, or promote healing.

RF diathermy is a medical treatment that uses RF induced heat as a form of physical therapy and in surgical procedures. It is commonly used for muscle relaxation. It is also a method of heating tissue electromagnetically for therapeutic purposes in medicine. Diathermy is used in physical therapy to deliver moderate heat directly to pathologic lesions in the deeper tissues of the body. Surgically, the extreme heat that can be produced by diathermy may be used to destroy neoplasms, warts, and infected tissues, and to cauterize blood vessels to prevent excessive bleeding. The technique is particularly valuable in neurosurgery and surgery of the eye. Diathermy equipment typically operates in the short-wave radio frequency (range 1–100 MHz) or microwave energy (range 434–915 MHz).

Pulsed electromagnetic field therapy (PEMF) is a medical treatment that purportedly helps to heal bone tissue reported in a recent NASA study. This method usually employs electromagnetic radiation of different frequencies – ranging from static magnetic fields, through extremely low frequencies (ELF) to higher radio frequencies (RF) administered in pulses.

== History ==
The idea that high-frequency electromagnetic currents could have therapeutic effects was explored independently around the same time (1890–91) by French physician and biophysicist Jacques Arsene d'Arsonval and Serbian American engineer Nikola Tesla. d'Arsonval had been studying medical applications for electricity in the 1880s and performed the first systematic studies in 1890 of the effect of alternating current on the body, and discovered that frequencies above 10 kHz did not cause the physiological reaction of electric shock, but warming. He also developed the three methods that have been used to apply high-frequency current to the body: contact electrodes, capacitive plates, and inductive coils. Nikola Tesla first noted around 1891 the ability of high-frequency currents to produce heat in the body and suggested its use in medicine.

By 1900 application of high-frequency current to the body was used experimentally to treat a wide variety of medical conditions in the quack medical field of electrotherapy. In 1899 Austrian chemist von Zaynek determined the rate of heat production in tissue as a function of frequency and current density, and first proposed using high-frequency currents for deep heating therapy. In 1908 German physician Karl Franz Nagelschmidt coined the term diathermy, and performed the first extensive experiments on patients.

Until the 1920s noisy spark-discharge Tesla coil and Oudin coil machines were used. These were limited to frequencies of 0.1 – 2 MHz, called "longwave" diathermy. The current was applied directly to the body with contact electrodes, which could cause skin burns. In the 1920s the development of vacuum tube machines allowed frequencies to be increased to 10 – 300 MHz, called "shortwave" diathermy. The energy was applied to the body with inductive coils of wire or capacitive plates insulated from the body, which reduced the risk of burns. By the 1940s microwaves were being used experimentally. In 1926 William T. Bovie discovered that RF currents applied to a scalpel could cut and cauterize tissue in medical operations, and electrosurgery generators or "Bovies" have been used in surgery ever since.

== See also ==
- Radiofrequency ablation
- Electrosurgery
