= Bovie Medical =

- Type: Public
- Traded as: AMEX: BVX
- Industry: Medical devices
- Founded: 1978
- Headquarters: Clearwater, Florida, United States
- Key people: Rob Gershon (CEO); Jack McCarthy (CCO); J. Robert Saron (president)
- Products: J-Plasma, monopolar, bipolar, Plazxact ablator, electrosurgery, veterinary, medical lighting, colposcopes
- Revenue: ▲$28.2 million (2019)
- Number of employees: 200

Bovie Medical Corporation was an American medical device manufacturer of medical devices, electrosurgical products and energy technologies. It was based in Clearwater, Florida with a manufacturing facility in Bulgaria.

In August 2019, the company sold off the electrocauterization portion of the business to Symmetry Surgical Inc. On January 1, 2019, the company rebranded as Apyx Medical and was listed under the new ticker symbol APYX on the NASDAQ.

== Company history ==
The company was founded in Purchase, New York in 1978. Bovie Medical takes its name from Dr. William T. Bovie, an American scientist and inventor who is credited with inventing the electrosurgical generator in 1926.

Bovie went public in 1983 and was listed on the NYSE under the symbol BVX.

The company also has an advanced energy unit used for cosmetic surgery under the device, Renuvion.

Bovie Medical sold their electrosurgical division and Bovie brand to Symmetry Surgical in 2018 for $97 million.
