= Marcelle Lapicque =

French neurophysiologist

Marcelle de Heredia Lapicque (17 July 1873 – 1960) was a Black-Cuban French neurophysiologist known for her research on nerve impulses (chronaxie) and the effects of poisons on the neuromuscular junction. She supervised the Laboratoire des Hautes-Études General Physiology laboratory, and published many papers - with her husband, alone, and as a mentor to women.

== Life ==
Lapicque was born on 17 July 1873 in Paris. Her father was a landowner and Paris municipal councillor, French politician Severiano de Heredia.

She studied science at the Sorbonne and was a prominent student of Louis Lapicque, whom she married in 1902. Lapicque completed her dissertation in 1905 on nerve impulses, in which she was supervised by her husband. She was in charge of the Laboratoire des Hautes-Études General Physiology laboratory until her death. Marcelle Lapicque, though overshadowed in histories of science by her husband, was an influential scientist in her own right, publishing many papers as sole author. Louis Lapicque "insisted on the importance of his wife as equal co-worker in all his research".

Lapicque published eighty papers with her husband and his students, but her name is not remembered, for a variety of reasons.

She was a member of the Société de Biologie, and published often in their Bulletin.

Lapicque's son Charles went on to become an engineer and a painter, and married the daughter of atomic scientist Jean Perrin.

Lapicque's obituary mentions that she was a gifted pianist, and that she "fought against the environment and against the prejudices of the times."

== Honors ==
French Academy of Science’s Lallemand Prize (1905)

Knight of the Legion of Honor (1933)

1st woman to win the Albert 1st of Monaco prize (1949)

== Biographical Errors ==
Biographical errors about Marcelle Lapicque were repeated in some sources, including that Charles Rene, her adopted son, was her biological son out of wedlock. There is no evidence for this; Charles's birth certificate, available online, gives his mother's name as Elise Thouvenin (Louis Lapicque's sister); all writing on Charles indicates that he was adopted by his uncle and aunt; and he refers to Marcelle as his aunt in letters.

These sources also fail to correctly identify the date of Lapicque's death. Her obituary by Catherine Veil published in Revue Générale des Sciences Pures et Appliquées in 1961 gives her year of death as 1960.
