= ConMed =

ConMed may refer to:

- An improper spelling of the global medical device company CONMED Corporation
- Concomitant medication, two medications used at or almost at the same time
- Conmed Healthcare Management, an American prison healthcare company
