= Severiano de Heredia =

French politician (1836–1901)

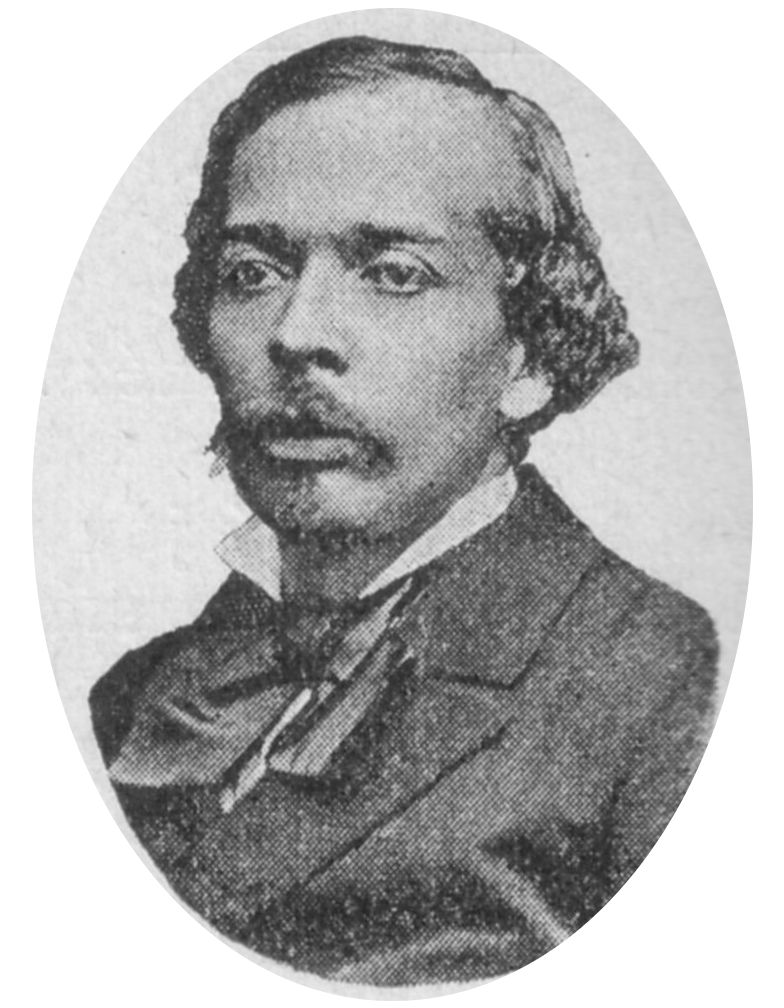

Paris municipal council
- In office April 1873 – 1881

Deputy of the Chamber of Deputies
- In office 21 August 1881 – 11 November 1889

Personal details
- Born: 8 November 1836 Havana, Cuba
- Died: 9 February 1901 (aged 64) Paris, France
- Resting place: Batignolles Cemetery, Paris, France
- Citizenship: Spanish, French
- Party: Republican Union (1881–1885); Radical Left (1885–1889)

Severiano de Heredia (8 November 1836 – 9 February 1901) was a Cuban-born biracial politician, a freemason, a left-wing republican, naturalized as French in 1870, who was president of the municipal council of Paris from 1 August 1879 to 12 February 1880, making him the only native of the American continent who was appointed on relevant post of the Mayor of Paris (Note: Although the city of Paris did not have an elected mayor between 1871 and 1977, the title of President of the municipal council during that period would be the equivalent of the actual position of Mayor. According to Nicolas Theodet, Severiano de Heredia was elected as the head of the Council of Paris in 1879, thereby becoming the equivalent of the time of mayor.) and the first mayor of African descent of a Western world capital.

In 1880, he succeeded Victor Hugo in the presidency of the Philotechnical Association. He served in the Chamber of Deputies from 1881 to 1889 and was briefly Minister of Public Works for the cabinet of Maurice Rouvier in 1887, at the time when the Eiffel Tower first started being built, where he planned and oversaw the construction of some of the finest French highways. He is believed to be a cousin of the famous French poet José-Maria de Heredia.

== Biography ==
=== Personal life ===
Severiano de Heredia was born in Matanzas, Cuba, to Henri de Heredia and mulatta Beatrice Cardenas. Reportedly he was the natural son of his godfather Don Ignacio Heredia y Campuzano-Polanco (Note: Don Ignacio Heredia y Campuzano-Polanco was the uncle of the poet José María Heredia) married to the French Madeleine Godefroy, who adopted him and sent him to France at the age of 10 for his education, attending the Lycée Louis-le-Grand in Paris. He applied for French citizenship which was granted under the Ministerial Decree of 28 September 1870.

He married at Paris, 3 November 1868, Henriette Hanaire, by whom he had a son in 1869, Henri-Ignace, and a daughter, Marcelle, in 1873. His son died in an accident at Wimereux at the age of twelve and was buried at Cimetière des Batignolles on 4 September 1882. His daughter studied at the Paris Medical School, became a notable neurophysiologist and formed a team with her husband, the neurophysiologist Louis Lapicque.

=== Political career ===
Upon the death of his godfather in 1848, Severiano de Heredia inherited his wealth and embarked on a career as a poet and literary critic. In 1871, while he was assuming the role of a conciliator, he published a political essay entitled "Paix et plébiscite" (Note: Peace and referendum) in which he pleaded for a democratic end to the Franco-Prussian War.

He entered politics as a radical Republican and was elected in April 1873 to be a member of the City Council of Paris, for the Ternes and Plaine-de-Monceaux neighborhoods (Note: Both neighbourhoods are part of the 17th arrondissement of Paris.). In 1879, he was elected president of the municipal council of Paris, and in August 1881 member to the Chamber of Deputies, where he stayed until he was defeated at the election of 1889 by a Boulangist opponent. On 30 May 1887, he was appointed Minister of Public Works in the government of Maurice Bouvier, until 11 December 1887. On retiring from politics he devoted himself to the history of literature.

Severiano de Heredia was also an active Freemason. Initiated in 1866 in the "Étoile polaire" (Note: North Star or Pole Star) lodge of Paris, he became Worshipfull Master of his lodge, and then Deputy of Grand Orient of France in 1875, and President of the Masonic Orphanage. Within this framework, Severiano de Heredia took part to the first French Congress for Women's Rights in 1878, as a French representative of the intended Committee of Initiative, at the Masonic Grand Orient.

=== Legacy ===
Severiano de Heredia was a radical progressive and a secular-minded freethinker, having fought in favor of public school and continuing education. As a strong advocate for the separation of church and state he played a very active role in the struggle for free, secular and compulsory education, professional training and the creation of municipal libraries. As an early ecologist, he devoted himself to improving the electric car.

Some versions claim that his last years were dedicated to work in the development of the electric car, which is why some qualify him as a pioneer of environmentalism. They also say that in this activity he pledged up to the last weight of his fortune, dying in misery. There are no clear precedents in this regard.

=== Tribute ===
Severiano de Heredia died of meningitis at his home in Paris, on 9 February 1901. Some one hundred and ten years after his death, historian Paul Estrade found no remaining public recognition for his career in his thoroughly researched biography. On September 10, 2013, at the initiative of Socialist elected official Lamine Ndaw and with the support of Mayor Bertrand Delanoë, her name was associated with a thoroughfare in the 17th arrondissement, as part of an operation to improve the diversity and parity of outstanding personalities in the public space19. Rue Severiano-de-Heredia is located in the Batignolles district.The Mairie de Paris announced in 2013 that a walkway in the 17th arrondissement of Paris will be dedicated to de Heredia in the name of equality and diversity. In 2015, a walkway in front of a new building was named rue Severiano de Heredia. In the naming ceremony, the then mayor of Paris, Anne Hidalgo, spoke:

The first black mayor of Paris and then minister of the French Republic was rejected and relegated for a long time among the forgotten of history. We are here to correct this guilty oversight.

— Anne Hidalgo

== Works ==
- L'appel au peuple : Paix ou guerre ? (1870)
- Faisons la paix (1871)
- Paix et plébiscite (1871)
- Société des écoles laïques... Appel aux habitants du 17^{e} arrondissement (1873)

== See also ==
- List of Afro-Latinos
- France
- French history
- French politics
- French Third Republic

== Notes and references ==
=== Bibliography ===
- Sabine Faivre d'Arcier: Los tres Heredia [The three Heredia], La Habana : Imagen Contemporánea (2012), in Spanish. ISBN 978-959-293-021-6
- Paul Estrade: Severiano de Heredia. Ce mulâtre cubain que Paris fit " maire ", et la République, ministre [Severiano de Heredia. This Cuban mulatto that Paris came to be "mayor", and the Republic Minister], series: " La boutique de l'histoire ", Les Indes savantes (15 July 2011), in French. ISBN 978-2-84654-270-8
