= Physiurgy =

Physiurgy is an obsolete term, mainly used in Scandinavia, for a medical specialty that deals with musculoskeletal physiology and diseases. The definition includes many rheumatic diseases, sports injuries and rehabilitation of orthopedic and neurological diseases. Physiurgic therapy include training and exercise therapy, massage, joint manipulation, diathermia and ultrasound treatment. In Denmark, the term was officially abandoned in 1983 and is largely replaced with e.g. rheumatology.
