= Electrodesiccation and curettage =

Medical procedure for treating skin cancers

- Other names: ED & C
- Specialty: Dermatology

Electrodesiccation and curettage (EDC, ED & C, or ED+C) is a medical procedure commonly performed by dermatologists, surgeons and general practitioners for the treatment of basal cell cancers and squamous cell cancers of the skin. It provides desiccation, coagulation/cauterization, and curettage to remove lesions from the skin.

== Procedure ==
A round dull instrument (curette) of varying sizes (1 mm to 6 mm) is used to scrape off the cancer down to the dermis. The scraping is then paused while an electrosurgical device like a hyfrecator is used next. Electrocoagulation (electrodesiccation) is performed over the raw surgical ulcer to denature a layer of the dermis and the curette is used again over the surgical ulcer to remove denatured dermis down to living tissue. In the case of skin cancers, the cautery and electrodesiccation is usually performed three times, or until the surgeon is confident that reasonable margins have been achieved.

== Applications ==
- Seborrheic keratosis
- Viral warts
- Bowens disease (in situ squamous cell carcinoma)
- Pyogenic granuloma
- Actinic keratoses
- Basal cell carcinoma
- Keratoacanthoma
- Skin tags

== Cure rate ==
The cure rate is highly user dependent. The more aggressive the surgeon is at performing EDC, the higher the cure rate. Like standard excision, the wider the surgical margin, the higher the cure rate. Cure rate for small cancer is higher than cure rate for larger cancers. Cure rate for nodular basal cell cancer is higher than for infiltrative basal cell cancer. Essentially, all the prognostic factors that apply to Mohs surgery and standard surgical excision will also apply to EDC.

== Advantages ==
The method is quick and easy to perform under local anesthetic. Used correctly, it can allow for adequate to good cosmetic results on small tumors in certain areas. No sutures are used, so a follow-up visit might not be necessary. Minimal expense is required. If recurrence occurs, rapid diagnosis is possible as the roots are exposed to the surface, and not buried by surgical closure methods (flaps, etc.).

== Disadvantages ==
As the surgical margin is not confirmed by pathology, the free surgical margin can not be confirmed by an objective pathology report. The recurrence rate for EDC is considered by many (National Comprehensive Cancer Network) to be too high for use on many facial regions, and on recurrent skin cancer. As a surgical ulcer is created and is larger than the original tumor, healing time may be delayed and subsequent scarring obvious.
