= Hyfrecator =

Medical apparatus used in electrosurgery

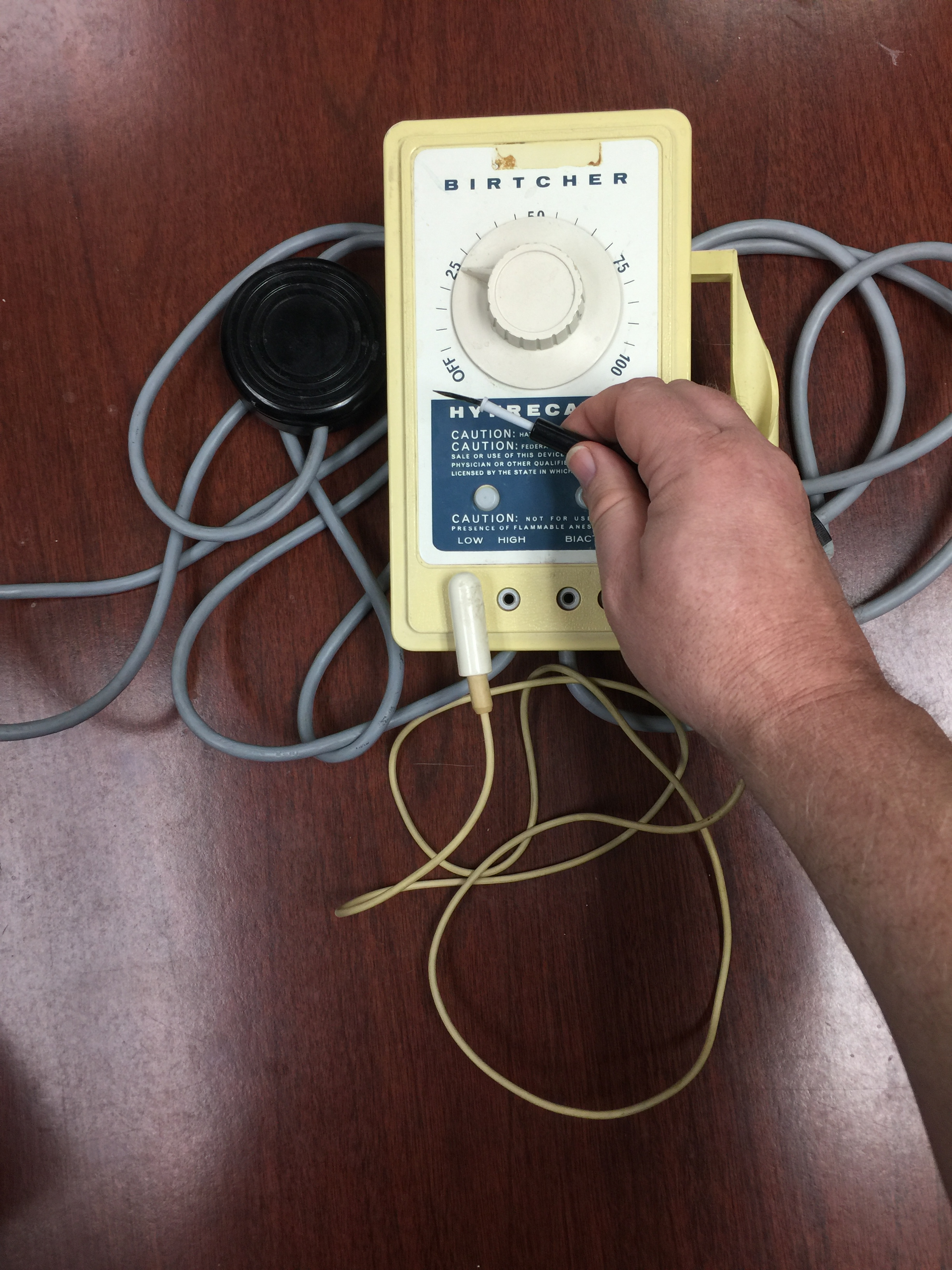
A Birtcher Corporation "Hyfrecator" manufactured in March 1982. Attached is a power cord (right) and foot on/off switch (left). Held in the hand to show scale is a "hand-piece" detachable sharp-pointed unipolar application electrode.

A hyfrecator is a low-powered medical apparatus used in electrosurgery on conscious patients, usually in an office setting. It is used to destroy tissue directly, and to stop bleeding during minor surgery. It works by emitting low-power high-frequency high-voltage AC electrical pulses, via an electrode mounted on a handpiece, directly to the affected area of the body. A continuous electric spark discharge may be drawn between probe and tissue, especially at the highest settings of power, although this is not necessary for the device to function. The amount of output power is adjustable, and the device is equipped with different tips, electrodes and forceps, depending on the electrosurgical requirement. Unlike other types of electrosurgery, the hyfrecator does not employ a dispersive electrode pad that is attached to the patient in an area not being treated, and that leads back to the apparatus (sometimes loosely but not quite correctly called a "ground pad"). It is designed to work with non-grounded (insulated) patients.

The word hyfrecator is a portmanteau derived from “high-frequency eradicator.” It was introduced as a brand name for a device introduced in 1940 by the Birtcher Corporation of Los Angeles. Birtcher also trademark registered the name Hyfrecator in 1939, and rights to the registered trademark were acquired by CONMED Corporation when it acquired Birtcher in 1995. Today, machines with the name Hyfrecator are sold only by ConMed Corporation. However, the word "hyfrecator" is sometimes used as a genericized trademark to refer to any dedicated non-ground-return electrosurgical apparatus, and a number of manufacturers now produce such machines, although not by this name.

== Differentiation from other types of electrosurgical equipment ==
The hyfrecator primarily differs from other electrosurgical devices in that it is low-powered and not intended for cutting tissue, thus enabling its use with conscious patients. The hyfrecator does not require a dispersive return pad, referred-to in the electrosurgery field as a "ground pad," or "patient plate," because the hyfrecator can pass a very low-powered current between forceps tips via bipolar output, or pass an A.C. current between one pointed metal electrode probe and the patient, with the patient's self-capacitance alone providing a current sink--this is equivalent to considering displacement current to be the return current.

In the latter mode, the patient must sit or lie on an insulated table, much as in the case with objects to be charged electrostatically with high-voltage D.C. (as from a Van de Graaff generator, for example). Stray ground paths between the patient and foreign conductors (such as a metal table leading somewhere to earth-ground) can offer another capacitative reservoir besides the patient, and burns out of the area of treatment may thus result, from current passing between patient and the earth-ground. For this reason, hyfrecation and all non-ground-pad electrosurgery is performed only on conscious patients, who would be aware of the burn and discomfort from an unwanted earth-ground path. (In types of electrosurgery which do employ a ground-pad, the ground-pad path serves as such a low resistance ground to the machine, that extraneous other ground paths become unimportant, and thus with proper precautions these methods can, and often are, used on anesthetized patients).

Because hyfrecation is always a relatively low-power modality, it can be used in some situations (such as very small nevus removal or skin tag removal) without local anaesthesia. In many other uses to destroy larger lesions, a local anesthetic injection or regional nerve block is used. The pain from hyfrecation is due to the burning of tissue, and the pain of electric current is absent, due to the high (radio) frequency which does not directly cause discharge of nerves.

Although the hyfrecator is not used primarily to cut tissue, it may be used in a secondary capacity to control bleeding, after tissue is cut by a standard surgical scalpel, or else it may be used to partly destroy superficial tissue, that is then removed by the scraping action of a curette. These are done under local anesthesia. An example of such a combination procedure is the standard method of electrodesiccation and curettage used by dermatologists to destroy skin cancers.

== Modes of use ==
Hyfrecators are used in two principal modes:

- Desiccation, in which electrical energy kills tissue near the probe tip by heating it past the temperature at which cells can survive. The method is called desiccation because it removes water from tissue as steam, leaving the tissue white and dead, without obviously being burned. This mode is usually employed with the probe in physical contact with the skin or lesion to be destroyed. This method is notable for causing relatively little actual destruction at the point of skin contact, but a large zone of destruction beneath the skin, as the current from the probe fans out into the tissue below the point of contact. Such effects may be deliberately employed in destruction of subcutaneous nodules, where minimal damage to the intact and normal skin surface is desired, at the same time as destruction and degeneration of a larger mass immediately beneath the skin, such as a subcutaneous wart or sebaceous gland.
- Fulguration, in which a deliberate spark is generated by touching or nearly touching the sharp probe to the lesion or skin. This results in far higher temperatures at the point of contact of the spark to skin, causing very high temperatures and carbonization (eschar) of the tissue immediately at the spark-contact point, and just below it. Thus, it results in the highest effect at the point of spark contact. This is most useful for completely destroying very superficial structures, such as nevi and skin tags, which protrude above the skin surface.

== Targets of use ==
- The hyfrecator has a large number of uses, such as removal of warts (especially recalcitrant warts), pearly penile papules, desiccation of sebaceous gland disorders, electrocautery of bleeding, epilation, destruction of small cosmetically unwanted superficial veins, in certain types of plastic surgery, and many other dermatological tasks. It may also be instrumental in the destruction of skin cancers such as basal cell carcinoma. For larger amounts of tissue destruction, the hyfrecator may be used in multiple sessions in the same area or point, as for example to gradually reduce the size of a large subcutaneous structure, such as a plantar wart.
- The hyfrecator is useful to control bleeding in dermatological office surgery in conscious patients, after tissue-cutting, tissue removal, or biopsy is first done mechanically, with a scalpel. See electrodesiccation and curettage.
- The hyfrecator can be used in almost all fields of medicine, e.g. podiatry, dentistry, ophthalmology, gynecology, and veterinary medicine.
- More recently, the hyfrecator is being used by those performing body modification services as a more precise way to brand the skin for aesthetic purposes. It allows more intricate and elaborate designs to be burned into the skin.
