= Harmonic scalpel =

Surgical Operation Instrument

The harmonic scalpel is a surgical instrument that (unlike electrosurgery) uses ultrasonic vibrations to cut and cauterize tissue.

== Medical use ==
The harmonic scalpel may be superior to electrosurgery in that it can cut through thicker tissue, creates less toxic surgical smoke, and poses somewhat less of a risk of electrocution or other potentially fatal complications.

== Mechanism ==
A harmonic scalpel cuts via vibration. The scalpel surface itself cuts through tissue by vibrating in the range of 55,500 Hz. The high frequency vibration of tissue molecules generates stress and friction in tissue, which generates heat and causes protein denaturation. This technique causes minimal energy transfer to surrounding tissue, potentially limiting collateral damage.

== Manufacture ==
The Harmonic brand is manufactured in Mexico and distributed by Ethicon Endo-Surgery a subsidiary of Johnson & Johnson.

== See also ==
- Instruments used in general surgery
