= William T. Bovie =

American scientist and inventor

- Born: September 11, 1882; Augusta, Michigan
- Died: January 1, 1958 (aged 75); Fairfield, Maine
- Education: University of Michigan
- Known for: Bovie electrocautery device
- Scientific career
- Fields: Biophysics
- Workplaces: Harvard University; Northwestern University; Jackson Laboratory

William T. Bovie (September 11, 1882 – January 1, 1958) was an American scientist and inventor. He is credited with conceptualizing the field of biophysics and with inventing a modern medical device known as the Bovie electrosurgical generator. Bovie taught or conducted research at Harvard University, Northwestern University, Jackson Laboratory and Colby College.

== Early life ==
Bovie was born in Michigan, the son of Henrietta (née Barnes) and William Bovie. His father practiced as both a rural physician and veterinarian, and he died when Bovie was 18 years old. Because of his father's death, Bovie had to save money to attend college, working as a stenographer while he did so.

Bovie went to Albion College before transferring to the University of Michigan. He earned an undergraduate degree in 1908, then completed a master's degree from the University of Missouri. While in Missouri, he met his future wife, Martha Adams. The couple had one son. In 1914, he completed a Ph.D. in plant physiology from Harvard University.

== Career ==
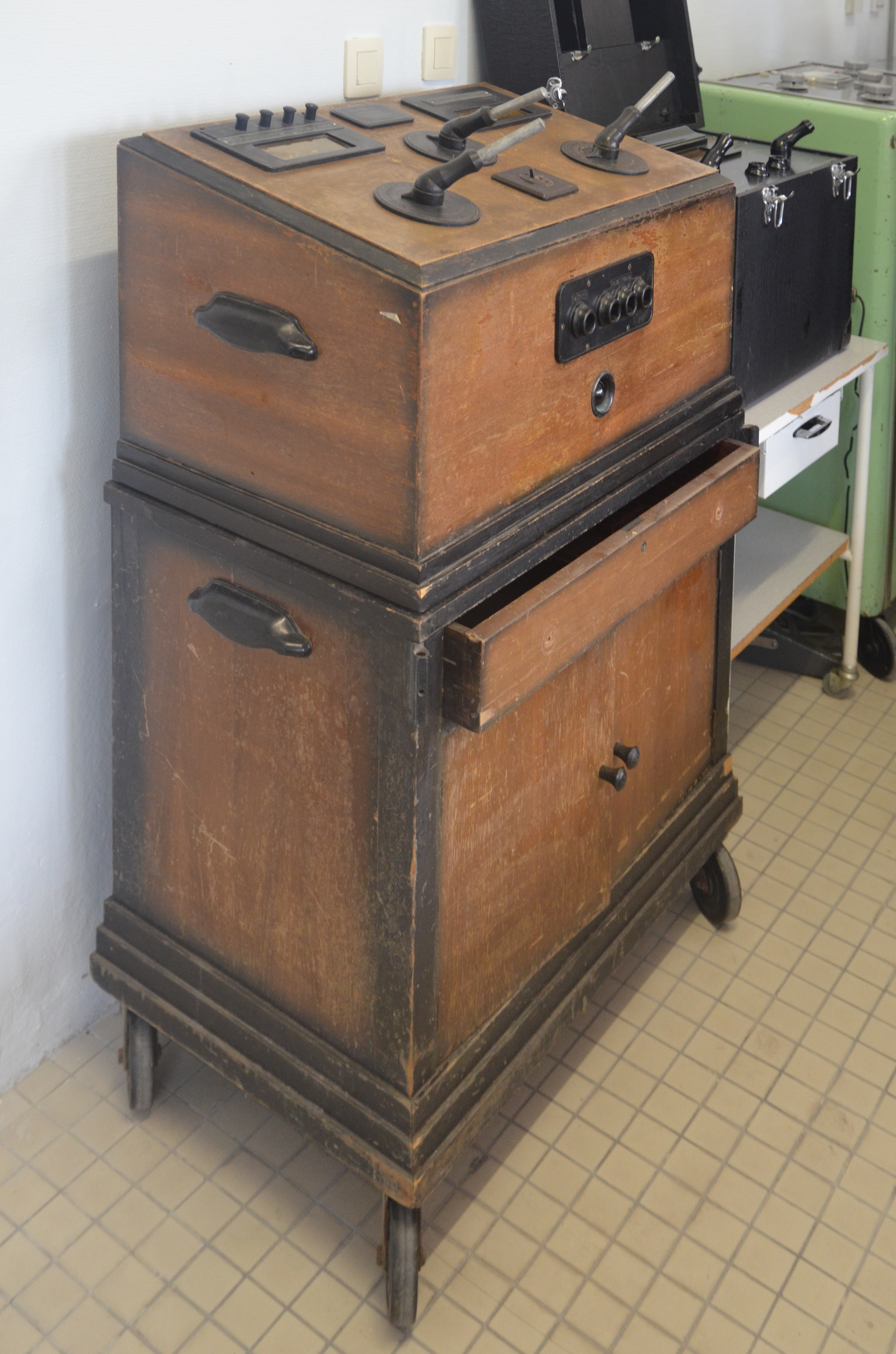
Bovie electrosurgical unit exhibited at the André Vésale hospital in Montigny-le-Tilleul (Belgium).

Bovie conducted research with radium at Harvard before working on electrocautery. He was not the first to work with electricity in surgery. It was known, for example, that electric current above certain frequencies could cut tissue without inducing muscular contraction. Bovie used such knowledge to create his electrosurgical device and he first employed it in neurosurgical cases with Harvey Cushing, known as the father of neurosurgery. Bleeding had been the significant obstacle in neurosurgery until Bovie and Cushing began to employ the device in 1926.

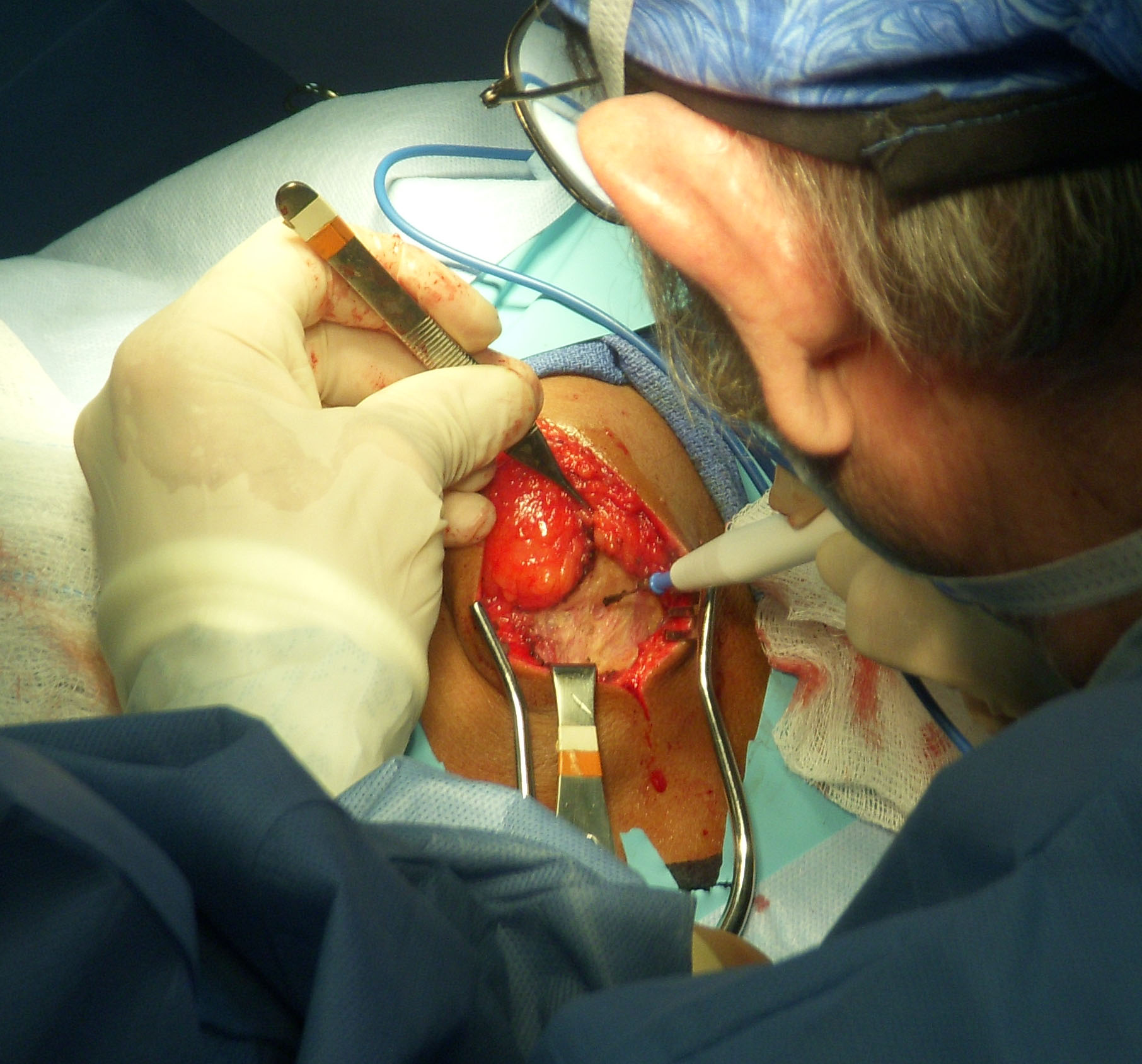
An electrosurgical unit in use during a modern surgery

Bovie's device allowed Cushing to reexplore operations in patients with brain masses that had been declared inoperable. While the device revolutionized surgery, there were occasional technical problems. Cushing recalled an instance in which the current from Bovie's device short circuited through a retractor. Electricity traveled up Cushing's arm and to his headlight, causing a sensation that Cushing described as "unpleasant to say the least." In another case, the Bovie device briefly ignited ether gas that was being given to a patient during surgery.

Known as the founder of the field of biophysics, Bovie chaired the new biophysics department at Northwestern University after his relatively brief association with Cushing. He received the John Scott Medal in 1928 for his development of the electrosurgical device. He was made a Fellow of the American Academy of Arts and Sciences.

Bovie later worked at Jackson Laboratory in Bar Harbor, Maine, and at Colby College.

== Later life ==
Bovie was relatively poor in his later life. He had not been motivated by financial gain, so he had sold the patent rights to his electrosurgical device to a manufacturer for one U.S. dollar. He had diabetes, arthritis, and long-standing obesity, and his early work with radium led to chronic pain in his hands. He died on January 1, 1958.

== Influence ==
The company Bovie Medical, a manufacturer of electrosurgical products, was named in his honour, some 20 years after his death.
