= Electrosurgery =

Use of high-frequency, alternating polarity, electrical current in medical operations

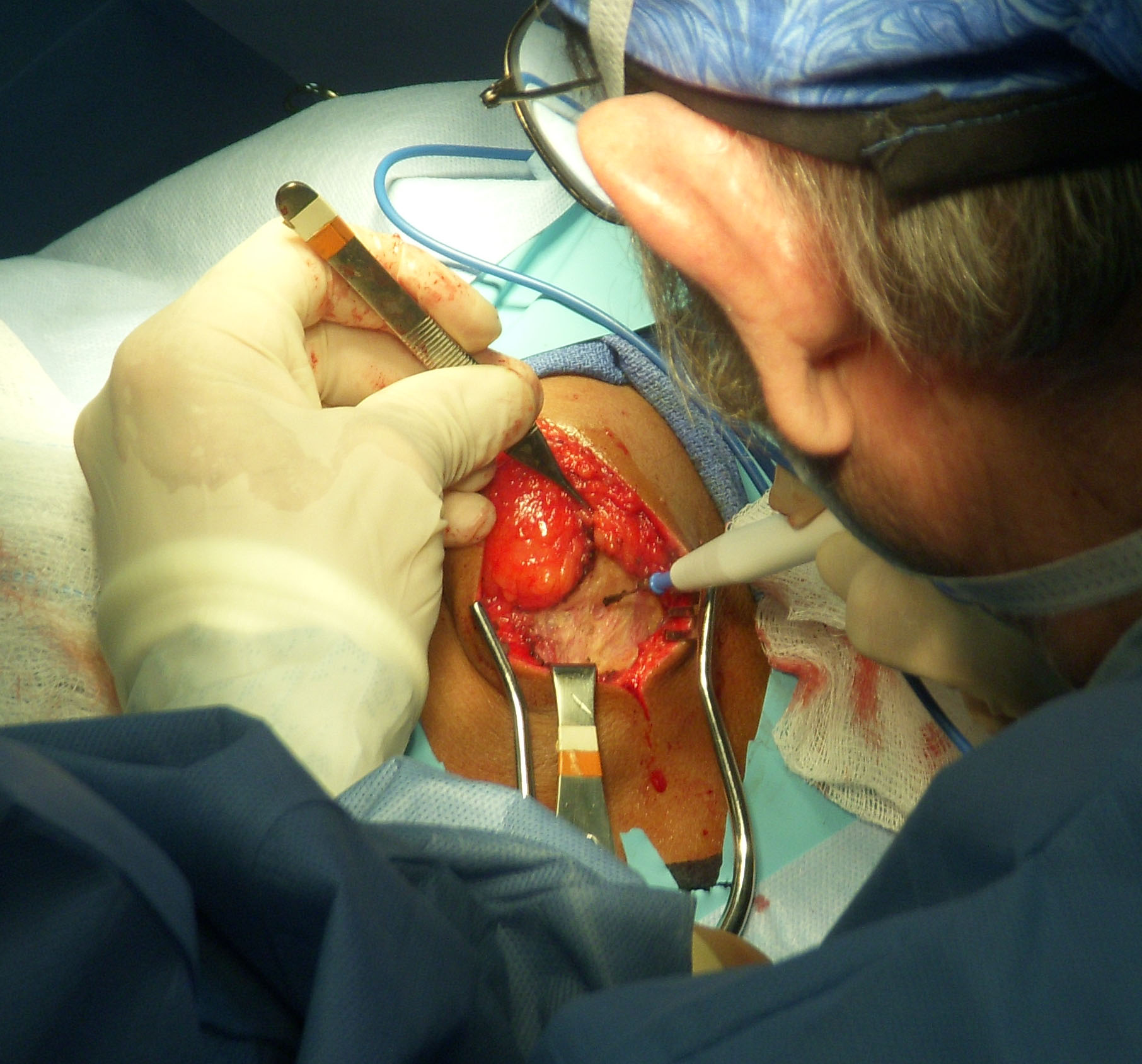
- A surgeon using a monopolar RF electrosurgical instrument to coagulate (and desiccate) tissue in the excision of a lipoma
- MeSH: D004598

Electrosurgery is the application of a high-frequency (radio frequency) alternating polarity, electrical current to biological tissue as a means to cut, coagulate, desiccate, or fulgurate tissue. Its benefits include the ability to make precise cuts with limited blood loss. Electrosurgical devices are frequently used during surgical operations helping to prevent blood loss in hospital operating rooms or in outpatient procedures.

In electrosurgical procedures, the tissue is heated by an electric current. Although electrical devices that create a heated probe may be used for the cauterization of tissue in some applications, electrosurgery refers to a different method than electrocautery. Electrocautery uses heat conduction from a probe heated to a high temperature by a direct electrical current (much in the manner of a soldering iron). This may be accomplished by direct current from dry-cells in a penlight-type device.

== Electrical stimulation of neural and muscle cells ==
Neural and muscle cells are electrically-excitable, i.e. they can be stimulated by electric current. In human patients such stimulation may cause acute pain, muscle spasms, and even cardiac arrest. Sensitivity of the nerve and muscle cells to electric field is due to the voltage-gated ion channels present in their cell membranes. Stimulation threshold does not vary much at low frequencies (so called rheobase-constant level). However, the threshold starts increasing with decreasing duration of a pulse (or a cycle) when it drops below a characteristic minimum (so called chronaxie). Typically, chronaxie of neural cells is in the range of 0.1–10 ms, so the sensitivity to electrical stimulation (inverse of the stimulation threshold) decreases with increasing frequency in the kHz range and above. (Note that frequency of the alternating electric current is an inverse of the duration of a single cycle). To minimize the effects of muscle and neural stimulation, electrosurgical equipment typically operates in the radio frequency (RF) range of 100 kHz to 5 MHz.

Operation at higher frequencies also helps minimizing the amount of hydrogen and oxygen generated by electrolysis of water. This is especially important consideration for applications in liquid medium in closed compartments, where generation of gas bubbles may interfere with the procedure. For example, bubbles produced during an operation inside an eye may obscure a field of view.

== Common electrode configurations for devices with isolated circuits ==
There are several commonly used electrode configurations or circuit topologies:

With "bipolar" instruments the current is applied to the patient using a pair of similarly-sized electrodes. For example, special forceps, with one tine connected to one pole of the RF generator and the other tine connected to the other pole of the generator. When a piece of tissue is held by the forceps, the RF alternating polarity electrical current oscillates between the two forceps tines, heating the intervening tissue by the previously described synchronous oscillation of intracellular ions.

In monopolar configuration the patient is attached to the dispersive electrode, a relatively large metal plate or a flexible metalized plastic pad which is connected to the RF generator or electrosurgical unit (ESU). The surgeon uses a pointed or blade shaped electrode called the "active electrode" to make contact with the tissue and exert a tissue effect - vaporization, and its linear propagation called electrosurgical cutting, or the combination of desiccation and protein coagulation used to seal blood vessels for the purpose of Hemostasis. The electric current oscillates between the active electrode and the dispersive electrode with the entire patient interposed between the two. Since the concentration of the RF current reduces with distance from the active electrode the current density rapidly (quadratically) decreases. Since the rate of tissue heating is proportional to the square of current density, the heating occurs in a very localized region, only near the portion of the electrode, usually the tip, near to or in contact with the target tissue.

On an extremity such as a finger, there is limited cross-sectional area to disperse the current, a circumstance which might result in higher current density and some heating throughout the volume of the extremity.

Another bipolar instrument is characterized with both electrodes on the same design, but the dispersive electrode is much larger than the active one. Since current density is higher in front of the smaller electrode, the heating and associated tissue effects take place only (or primarily) in front of the active electrode, and exact position of the dispersive electrode on tissue is not critical. Sometimes such configuration is called sesquipolar, even though the origin of this term in Latin (sesqui) means a ratio of 1.5.

=== Dedicated non-grounded machines without a dispersive electrode ===
Relatively low-powered high frequency electrosurgery can be performed on conscious outpatients with no grounded machines without a dispersive electrode . Operating at low currents with no dispersive electrode is possible because, at the medium RF frequencies (usually 100 – 500 kHz) that the machines generate, the self-capacitance of the patient's body (which is between the patient's body and the machine's ground) is large enough to allow the resulting displacement current to act as a virtual "circuit completion path."

One example of such a machine is called a hyfrecator. This term began in 1940 as a Birtcher Corporation brand name Hyfrecator for "High Frequency Eradicator", but now serves generically to describe a general class of single-electrode, non-isolated (earth-referenced) low-powered electrosurgical machines intended mainly for office use. An accidental circuit completion path through an earth-ground creates the danger of a burn at a site far away from the probe electrode, and for this reason single-electrode devices are used only on conscious patients who would be aware of such complications, and only on carefully insulated tables.

In such a setting, hyfrecators are not used to cut tissue, but to destroy relatively small lesions, and also to stop bleeding in surgical incisions made by blade instruments under local anesthesia.

== Electrosurgical modalities ==
In cutting mode electrode touches the tissue, and sufficiently high power density is applied to vaporize its water content. Since water vapor is not conductive under normal circumstances, electric current cannot flow through the vapor layer. Energy delivery beyond the vaporization threshold can continue if sufficiently high voltage is applied (> +/-200 V) to ionize vapor and convert it into a conductive plasma. Vapor and fragments of the overheated tissue are ejected, forming a crater. Electrode surfaces intended to be used for cutting often feature a finer wire or wire loop, as opposed to a more flat blade with a rounded surface.

Coagulation is performed using waveforms with lower average power, generating heat insufficient for explosive vaporization, but producing a thermal coagulum instead.

Electrosurgical desiccation occurs when the electrode touches the tissue open to air, and the amount of generated heat is lower than that required for cutting. The tissue surface and some of the tissue more deep to the probe dries out and forms a coagulum (a dry patch of dead tissue). This technique may be used for treating nodules under the skin where minimal damage to the skin surface is desired.

In fulguration mode, the electrode is held away from the tissue, so that when the air gap between the electrode and the tissue is ionized, an electric arc discharge develops. In this approach, the burning to the tissue is more superficial, because the current is spread over the tissue area larger than the tip of electrode. Under these conditions, superficial skin charring or carbonization is seen over a wider area than when operating in contact with the probe, and this technique is therefore used for very superficial or protrusive lesions such as skin tags. Ionization of an air gap requires voltage in the kV range.

Besides the thermal effects in tissue, the electric field can produce pores in the cellular membranes – a phenomenon called electroporation. This effect may affect cells beyond the range of thermal damage.

=== Wet field electrosurgery ===
There are wet and dry field electrosurgical devices. Wet field devices operate in a saline solution, or in an open wound. Heating is as a result of an alternating current that passes between two electrodes. Heating is usually greatest where the current density is highest. Therefore, it is usually the smallest or sharpest electrode that generates the most heat.

Cut/Coag Most wet field electrosurgical systems operate in two modes: "Cut" causes a small area of tissue to be vaporized, and "Coag" causes the tissue to "dry" (in the sense of bleeding being stopped). "Dried" tissues are killed (and will later slough or be replaced by fibrotic tissue) but they are temporarily physically intact after electrosurgical application. The depth of tissue death is typically a few millimeters near the contact of the electrode.

Cut If the voltage level is high enough, the heat generated can create a vapour pocket. The vapour pocket typically reaches temperatures of approximately 400 degrees Celsius, which vaporizes and explodes a small section of soft tissue, resulting in an incision.

Coag When the system is operating in "coag mode" the voltage output is usually higher than in cut mode. Tissue remains grossly intact, but cells are destroyed at the point of contact, and smaller vessels are destroyed and sealed, stopping capillary and small-arterial bleeding.

== Electrosurgical waveforms ==
Different waveforms can be used for different electrosurgical procedures. For cutting, a continuous single frequency sine wave is often employed. Rapid tissue heating leads to explosive vaporization of interstitial fluid. If the voltage is sufficiently high (> 400 V peak-to-peak) the vapor sheath is ionized, forming conductive plasma. Electric current continues to flow from the metal electrode through the ionized gas into the tissue. Rapid overheating of tissue results in its vaporization, fragmentation and ejection of fragments, allowing for tissue cutting. In applications of a continuous wave the heat diffusion typically leads to formation of a significant thermal damage zone at the edges of the lesion. Open circuit voltage in electrosurgical waveforms is typically in the range of 300–10,000 V peak-to-peak.

Higher precision can be achieved with pulsed waveforms. Using bursts of several tens of microseconds in duration the tissue can be cut, while the size of the heat diffusion zone does not exceed the cellular scale. Heat accumulation during repetitive application of bursts can also be avoided if sufficient delay is provided between the bursts, allowing the tissue to cool down. The proportion of ON time to OFF time can be varied to allow control of the heating rate. A related parameter, duty cycle, is defined as the ratio of the ON time to the period (the time of a single ON-OFF cycle). In the terminology of electrical engineering, the process of altering this ratio to achieve an average amplitude, instead of altering the amplitude directly is called pulse-width modulation.

For coagulation, the average power is typically reduced below the threshold of cutting. Typically, sine wave is turned on and off in rapid succession. The overall effect is a slower heating process, which causes tissue to coagulate. In simple coagulation/cutting mode machines, the lower duty cycle typical of coagulation mode is usually heard by the ear as a lower frequency and a rougher tone than the higher frequency tone typical of cutting mode with the same equipment.

Many modern electrosurgical generators provide sophisticated wave forms with power adjusted in real time, based on changes of the tissue impedance.

== Prevention of unintended harm ==
Burns

For the high power surgical uses during anesthesia the monopolar modality relies on a good electrical contact between a large area of the body (Typically at least the entire back of the patient) and the return electrode or pad (also known as dispersive pad or patient plate). Severe burns (3rd degree) can occur if the contact with the return electrode is insufficient, or when a patient comes into contact with metal objects serving as an unintended (capacitative) leakage path to Earth/Ground.

To prevent unintended burns, the skin is cleaned and a conductive gel is used to enhance the contact with the return electrode. Proper electrical grounding practices must be followed in the electrical wiring of the building. It is also recommended to use a modern ElectroSurgical Unit that includes a return electrode monitoring system that continuously tests for reliable and safe patient contact. These systems interrogate the impedance of a split or dual-pad return electrode and will alarm out, disabling further generator output in case of fault. Prior generators relied on single pad return electrodes and thus had no means of verifying safe patient connection. Return electrodes should always have full contact with the skin and be placed on the same side of the body and close to the body part where the procedure is occurring.

If there is any metal in the body of the patient, the return electrode is placed on the opposite side of the body from the metal and be placed between the metal and the operation site. This prevents current from passing selectively through metal on the way to the return electrode. For example, for a patient who has had a right sided hip replacement who is scheduled for surgery, the return electrode is placed on the left side of the body on the lateral side of the lower abdomen, which places the return electrode between the location of the metal and the surgical site and on the opposite side from the metal. If there is metal on both sides of the body, the return electrode is placed between the metal and the procedure site when possible. Common return electrode locations include lateral portions of the outer thighs, abdomen, back, or shoulder blades.

The use of the bipolar option does not require the placement of a return electrode because the current only passes between tines of the forceps or other bipolar output device.

Electrosurgery should only be performed by a physician who has received specific training in this field and who is familiar with the techniques used to prevent burns.

Smoke toxicity

Concerns have also been raised regarding the toxicity of surgical smoke produced by electrosurgery. This has been shown to contain various volatile organic compounds (VOCs), including formaldehyde, which may cause harm by inhalation by the patients, surgeon or operating theatre staff.

Fire hazard

Electrical knives should not be used around flammable substances, like alcohol-based disinfectants.

== History ==
Development of the first commercial electrosurgical device is credited to William T. Bovie, who developed the first electrosurgical device while employed at Harvard University. The first use of an electrosurgical generator in an operating room occurred on October 1, 1926 at Peter Bent Brigham Hospital in Boston, Massachusetts. The operation—removal of a mass from a patient's head—was performed by Harvey Cushing. The low powered hyfrecator for office use was introduced in 1940.

== See also ==
- Cryosurgery
- Laser surgery
- Electrocautery
- Dielectric heating
- microwave minimaze procedure
- Na effect
- Harmonic scalpel
- Medical applications of radio frequency
