= Surgical smoke =

Smoke produced as a by-product during surgery

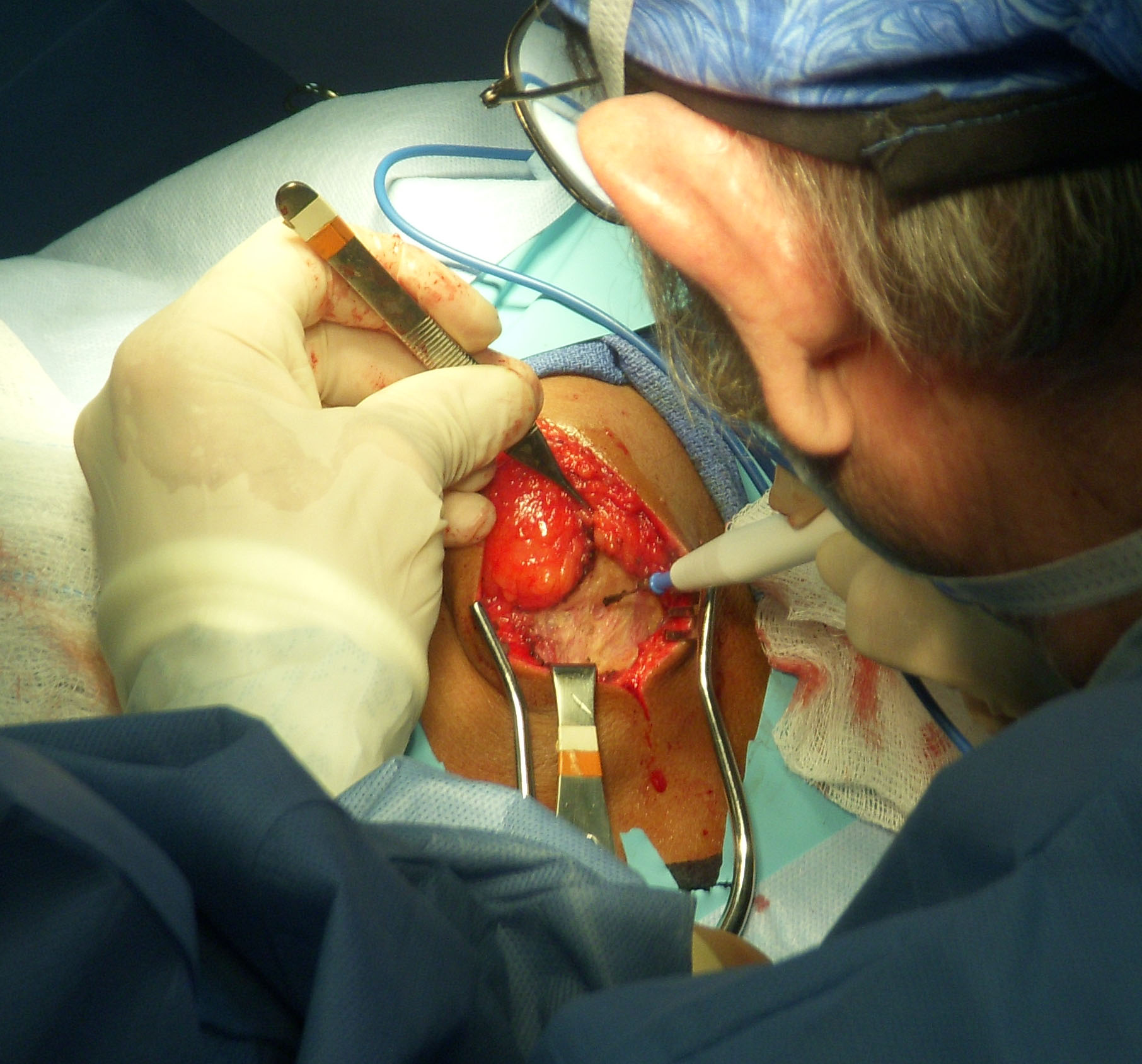
A surgeon using an electrosurgical unit, a common source of surgical smoke.

Surgical smoke is the by-product produced by electrosurgery, laser tissue ablation, or other surgical techniques. Surgical smoke, as a health threat to those exposed to it, has become a growing concern. Studies have demonstrated, depending on several factors, it may contain carcinogens, mutagens, irritant chemicals, live viruses and bacteria, and viable malignant cells. These all pose a theoretical and demonstrable risk of harming patients or operating room personnel upon exposure. Other names for surgical smoke are cautery smoke, plume, diathermy plume. Descriptive terms used to designate the phenomenon in literature include,"aerosols produced during surgery", "vapor contaminants", or "surgical air contamination".

Electrosurgery and laser ablation are the most common sources of surgical smoke. Heat generated during surgery causes cell membranes to heat and rupture, releasing cellular debris alongside water vapor. Surgical smoke is composed of 95% water and the remaining 5% contains byproducts of combustion and cellular debris. The negative health effects due to exposure of surgical smoke is attributed to what is contained in the 5%. The size of particles within the plume of smoke varies depending on the device that generated it. On average electrosurgery produces particles that are .07 μm, while laser ablation generates larger particles that are .31 μm on average. Particles smaller than 2 micrometers are able to reach the alveoli within the lower respiratory tract and, if 0.1 μm or smaller, can enter systemic circulation.

The amount of cellular debris in a smoke plume changes with the tissue being cauterized. The liver has been shown to generate the largest amount of particles. Other than type of tissue and surgical device, operating room airflow can also affect smoke exposure.

== Health impact ==
The cellular debris included in surgical smoke has been shown to include live bacteria and viruses, and even viable malignant cells. The negative effects of surgical smoke exposure to humans is less documented than its effects on animals. Acute negative effects due to the exposure of surgical smoke may include headaches, eye and throat irritation, nausea, drowsiness and dizziness. Operating personnel have been found to have an increased risk of chronic pulmonary and upper respiratory health problems compared to other populations. Human papilloma virus has been the only virus to demonstrate spreading via surgical smoke, despite concern for other viruses. Besides potential health effects, surgical smoke can visually obscure the surgical field.

The amount of benzene detected in operating room air has been shown to be greater than the recommended exposure limits established by the National Institute for Occupational Safety and Health (NIOSH) and the Occupational Safety and Health Administration (OSHA) which are 0.1 mg/m^{3} and 0.2 mg/m^{3} respectively.

== Minimizing exposure ==
The pores on a standard surgical mask are 5-15 μm in diameter, which is inadequate in completely protecting operating room personnel from the harms of surgical smoke. Due to studies evaluating particles passing through standard surgical masks, some suggested that more effective masks such as HEPA-filters and N95 should be used to provide better protection from cellular debris. Others suggest that even N95s are ineffective at reducing health risks associated with ultra-fine particulate matter. Particulate matter is not the only pollutant produced by surgical smoke. Various volatile organic compounds are also created. Masks will be ineffective against gaseous compounds unless specialized filtration is used such as activated carbon or catalytic mesh.

Smoke evacuation devices (SED) are the most effective at reducing exposure of surgical smoke. However, the use of these devices is not widespread. Lack of SED usage has been attributed to low amounts of education surrounding the risks of surgical smoke and the surgeons' unwillingness to adopt such devices. It has been suggested that the bulkiness of these devices and noise are factors contributing to lack of surgeons' enthusiasm for SED usage.
