= CONMED Corporation =

American medical equipment company

- Company type: Public company
- Traded as: Nasdaq: CNMD; S&P 600 component
- Founded: 1970
- Headquarters: Largo, Florida, United States; Utica, New York, United States (former)
- Key people: Curt Hartman; (chairman of the board, President, and CEO)
- Revenue: ▲US$1.05 billion (2022)
- Operating income: ▲US$ -70.9 million (2022)
- Net income: ▼US$ -80.6 million (2022)
- Total assets: ▲US$2.3 million (2022)
- Total equity: ▼US$1.6 million (2022)
- Number of employees: 4,100 (2022)
- Website: www.conmed.com

The CONMED Corporation is a publicly traded American manufacturer of medical equipment and surgical devices, primarily in the orthopedic, laparoscopic and general surgery, and patient care areas. CONMED's headquarters is in Largo, Florida. Prior to July 2022, it was in Utica, New York. CONMED embraces a people-first culture that starts with a mission to support their healthcare partners and the patients they serve. They have manufacturing facilities in the United States and Mexico, offices internationally, and a vast global footprint.

CONMED manufactures hundreds of products, including the AirSeal® iFS insufflator, PlumeSafe® X5™ Smoke Evacuator, BioBrace® Reinforced Bioinductive Implant, Y-Knot® All-Suture Anchor, and Argo Knotless® Suture Anchor.

== History ==
In 1970, Eugene Corasanti (1930–2015) purchased a small medical supplied distributor in Utica, New York. He originally named the company Concor Enterprises, but later renamed it to Consolidated Medical Equipment, Inc. Its first product was a disposable ECG electrode. Growing through acquisitions, Corasanti served as CEO until 2006 when Curt Hartman gained the President, CEO, and Chairman of the Board position in 2014. Pat Beyer took over as President and CEO on January 1, 2025.

Today, CONMED remains focused on assisting healthcare providers enhance patient outcomes.

== Acquisitions ==
- 1989: Aspen Labs from Bristol-Myers Squibb
- 1995: New Dimensions in Medicine Inc. and the Birtcher Corporation, manufacturer of the Hyfrecator
- 1997: Linvatec Corp, from Bristol-Myers Squibb
- 2002: ValMed and NorTrex Medical
- 2003: Core Dynamics and Bionx Implants
- 2004: Endoscopic unit of C R Bard Inc
- 2012: Viking Systems
- 2016: SurgiQuest
- 2017: ExoShape ACL product line from MedShape
- 2019: Buffalo Filter
- 2022: In2Bones and Biorez
