= Louis Lapicque =

French neuroscientist (1866–1952)

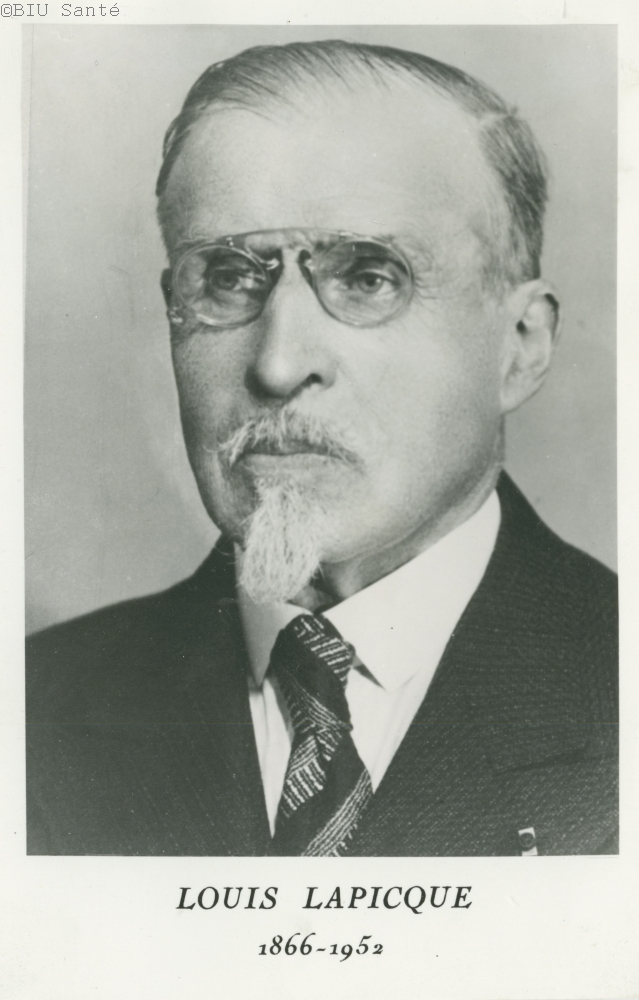
Louis Lapicque

Louis Édouard Lapicque (1 August 1866 – 6 December 1952) was a French neuroscientist, socialist activist, antiboulangist, dreyfusard and freemason who was very influential in the early 20th century. One of his main contributions was to propose a model of neural input integration that later lead to the integrate-and-fire model of the neuron. Today, this model of the neuron is still one of the most popular models in computational neuroscience for both cellular and neural networks studies, as well as in mathematical neuroscience because of its simplicity. A review article was published for the centenary of Lapicque's original 1907 paper, which also includes an English translation of it.

His wife, Marcelle Lapicque, was also a neurophysiologist. Louis Lapicque "insisted on the importance of his wife as equal co-worker in all his research".

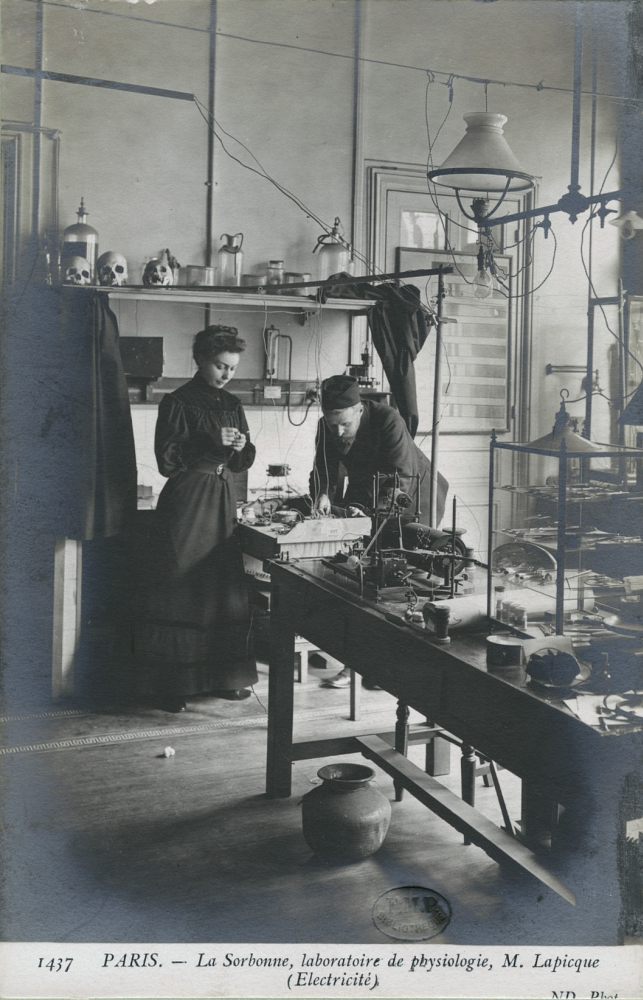
Lapicque's laboratory at the Sorbonne

== Works ==
- Notice on titles and scientific works of Louis Lapicque (1908)
- Excitability function of time, chronaxie, its meaning and its measure (1926)
- Nervous machine (1943)
- Neuromuscular isochronism and rythmogenic excitability (1947)
- On reaction times according to races and social conditions (1901)
- Quantitative research on nervous electrical excitation treated like a polarization (1907)
- Consciousness as a cellular function (1952)

== See also ==
- Chronaxie
