= Diathermy =

Medical treatment using electromagnetically-induced heat

- Pronunciation: /ˈdaɪəˌθɜːrmi/
- ICD-9-CM: 93.34
- MeSH: D003972

Diathermy is electrically induced heat or the use of high-frequency electromagnetic currents as a form of physical therapy and in surgical procedures. The earliest observations on the reactions of the human organism to high-frequency electromagnetic currents were made by Jacques Arsene d'Arsonval. The field was pioneered in 1907 by German physician Karl Franz Nagelschmidt, who coined the term diathermy from the Greek words διά (dia) and θέρμη (thermē), literally meaning 'heating through' (adjectival forms: 'diathermal' and 'diathermic').

Diathermy is commonly used for muscle relaxation and induce deep tissue heating for therapeutic purposes in medicine. It is used in physical therapy to deliver moderate heat directly to pathologic lesions in the deeper tissues of the body.

Diathermy is produced by two techniques: short-wave radio frequencies in the range 1–100 MHz (shortwave diathermy) or microwaves typically in the 915 MHz or 2.45 GHz bands (microwave diathermy), the methods differing mainly in their penetration capability. It exerts physical effects and elicits a spectrum of physiological responses.

The same techniques are also used to create higher tissue temperatures to destroy neoplasms, warts, and infected tissues; this is called hyperthermia treatment. In surgery, diathermy is used to cauterize blood vessels to prevent excessive bleeding. The technique is particularly valuable in neurosurgery and in eye surgery.

== History ==
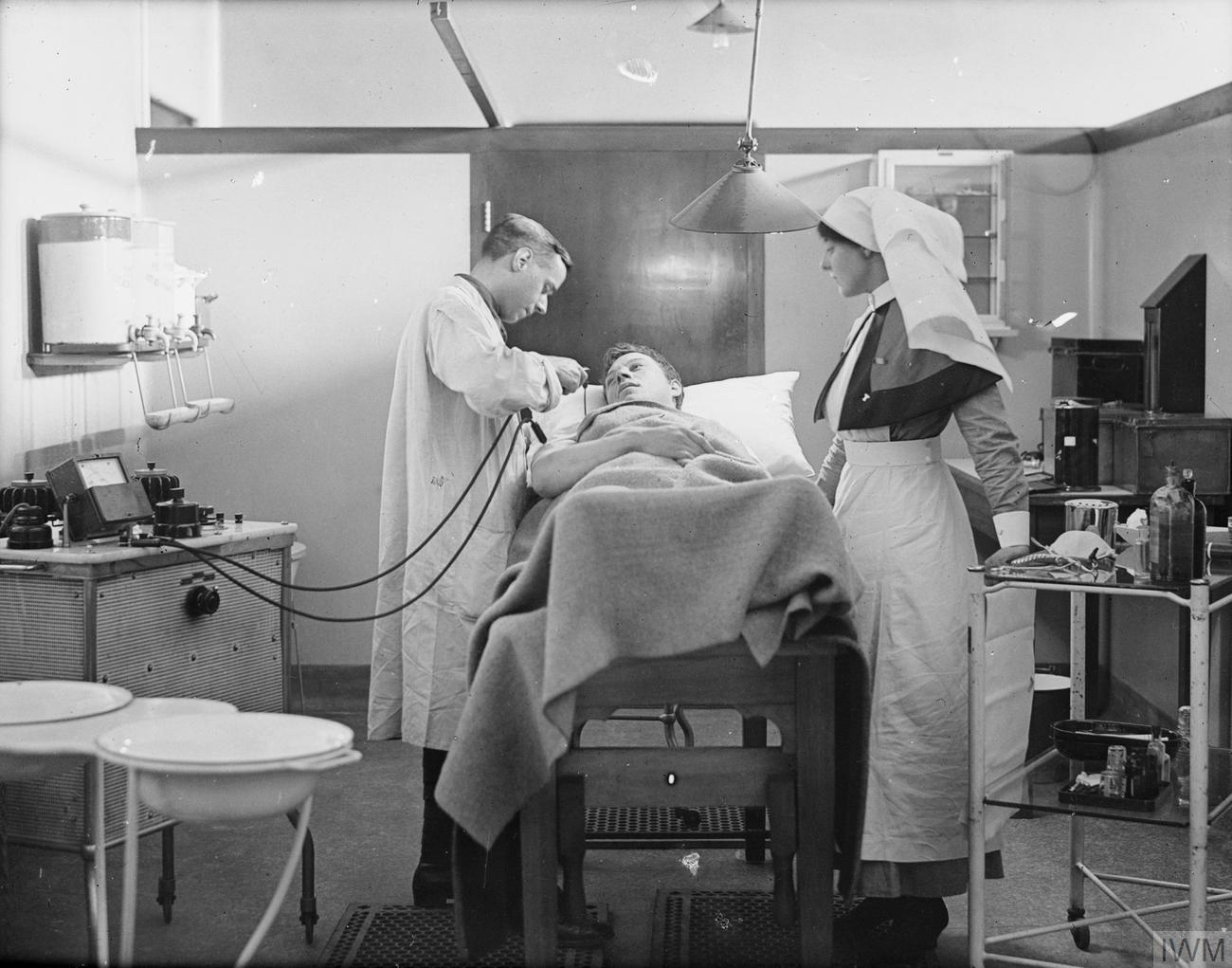
Diathermy treatment in London, 1918

The idea that high-frequency electromagnetic currents could have therapeutic effects was explored independently around the same time (1890–1891) by French physician and biophysicist Jacques Arsene d'Arsonval and Serbian American engineer Nikola Tesla. d'Arsonval had been studying medical applications for electricity in the 1880s and performed the first systematic studies in 1890 of the effect of alternating current on the body, and discovered that frequencies above 10 kHz did not cause the physiological reaction of electric shock, but warming. He also developed the three methods that have been used to apply high-frequency current to the body: contact electrodes, capacitive plates, and inductive coils. Nikola Tesla first noted around 1891 the ability of high-frequency currents to produce heat in the body and suggested its use in medicine.

By 1900 application of high-frequency current to the body was used experimentally to treat a wide variety of medical conditions in the new medical field of electrotherapy. In 1899, Austrian chemist von Zaynek determined the rate of heat production in tissue as a function of frequency and current density and first proposed using high-frequency currents for deep-heating therapy. In 1908, German physician Karl Franz Nagelschmidt coined the term diathermy and performed the first extensive experiments on patients. Nagelschmidt is considered the founder of the field. He wrote the first textbook on diathermy in 1913, which revolutionized the field.

Until the 1920s, noisy spark-discharge Tesla coil and Oudin coil machines were used. These were limited to frequencies of 0.1–2 MHz, called "longwave" diathermy. The current was applied directly to the body with contact electrodes, which could cause skin burns. In the 1920s, the development of vacuum tube machines enabled frequencies to be increased to 10–300 MHz, a range called "shortwave" diathermy. The energy was applied to the body via inductive coils of wire or capacitive plates insulated from the body, reducing the risk of burns. By the 1940s, microwaves were being used experimentally.

== Uses ==
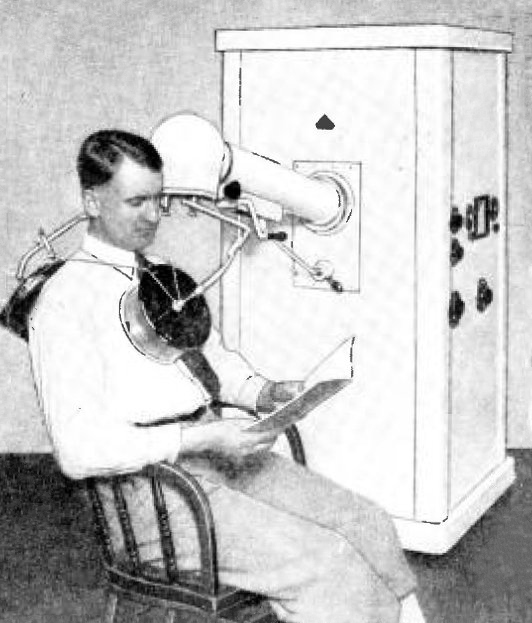
Shortwave diathermy machine, 1933

=== Physical medicine and rehabilitation ===
The two forms of diathermy employed in physical medicine and rehabilitation are short wave and microwave. The application of moderate heat by diathermy increases blood flow and speeds up metabolism and the rate of ion diffusion across cellular membranes. The fibrous tissues in tendons, joint capsules, and scars are more easily stretched when subjected to heat, thus facilitating the relief of stiffness of joints and promoting relaxation of the muscles and decrease of muscle spasms.

==== Short wave ====
Shortwave diathermy machines initially used two condenser plates positioned on either side of the body part being treated. Another mode of application was through induction coils that were flexible and could be shaped to fit the body part to be treated (Nikola Tesla coils). As the high-frequency waves travel through the body's tissues between the capacitors or coils, the energy is also converted into heat. The degree of heat and depth of penetration depend in part on the absorption of power as well as the electrical impedance of the current path between the electrodes, measured in ohms whose symbol is the Greek letter omega (Ω).

Shortwave diathermy operations use ISM band frequencies of 4.00, 8.00, 13.56, 27.12, and 40.68 MHz. Most professional electromedical devices deliver frequencies of 4.00, 8 .00 and 27.12 MHz.

SWD (shortwave diathermy) differs substantially from medium frequency diathermy which uses much lower frequencies (between 0.5 MHz and 1.00 MHz); the latter encountering particular resistance to penetrate deep tissues to the point of forcing the use of conductive creams or gels during sessions as known in treatments with Tecar therapy, for example. In summary, the energy induced with medium frequencies passes through the cellular interstices, with high frequencies it totally irradiates the cell. This notable difference can be seen in electrosurgical units.

As highlighted by various studies, in summary, short waves, thanks to their thermal and non-thermal effects, are able to strengthen the microcirculation of the anatomical area treated (angiogenesis), therefore inducing an anti-edematous, anti-inflammatory, muscle-relaxing, pain-relieving and proregenerative. In particular, 8 MHz (eight million Hertz) is used to soothe colon, rectal and lung cancer. Published studies have demonstrated not only their effectiveness, but also the increase in life expectancy of treated patients

The devices that have proven to be effective use filters, suitable for the purpose, to be able to deliver a wave with a practically perfect sinusoidal curve or in any case to drastically reduce any harmonics, with an impedance range, calculated on the Interposed, therefore on known impedance values, in reference to the frequencies involved and the materials used. All this means that the energy irradiates the treated part in an open cone, going well beyond the belly of the muscle.

High frequencies (8 MHz in particular) represent a very efficient means with which to transport the energy of the electromagnetic impulse directly to the anatomical site of interest: as the frequency increases, the resistance offered by the tissues is reduced, the impulse is therefore to go beyond the cell membrane and reach the deep tissues without significant energy dissipation. The impulse is distributed according to the architecture of the tissues, preferring and concentrating in the pathways that have a higher liquid content. From a technical point of view, the skin is not subject to a direct increase in temperature (there is no risk of scalds or burns) and the treatment can be focused quite precisely on the deep tissues of interest. In an easy way. For this reason, no conductive gels or creams are needed and the user, a healthcare professional, can focus (hold the handpiece still) in a static manner on the part to be treated, for example for rhizarthrosis or in a post-operative situation on top of TNT

Shortwave diathermy is usually prescribed to treat deep muscles and joints covered by a heavy mass of soft tissue, such as the hip. In some cases, short wave diathermy can be applied to localize deep inflammatory processes, such as in pelvic inflammatory disease, in the thoracic-pulmonary part, in osteodegenerative diseases, in post-prosthetic surgery. Shortwave diathermy can also be used for hyperthermia therapy and electrolysis therapy, as an adjuvant to radiation in cancer treatment, especially 8.00 MHz. Typically, hyperthermia would be added twice a week before radiation therapy, as shown in the photograph from a 2010 clinical trial at the Mahavir Cancer Sansthan in Patna, India.

==== Microwave ====
Microwave diathermy uses microwaves, radio waves which are higher in frequency and shorter in wavelength than the short waves above. Microwaves, which are also used in radar, have a frequency above 300 MHz and a wavelength less than one meter. Most, if not all, of the therapeutic effects of microwave therapy are related to the conversion of energy into heat and its distribution throughout the body tissues. This mode of diathermy is considered to be the easiest to use, but the microwaves have a relatively poor depth of penetration.

Microwaves cannot be used in high dosage on edematous tissue, over wet dressings, or near metallic implants in the body because of the danger of local burns. Microwaves and short waves cannot be used on or near persons with implanted electronic cardiac pacemakers.

Hyperthermia induced by microwave diathermy raises the temperature of deep tissues from 41 °C to 45 °C using electromagnetic power. The biological mechanism that regulates the relationship between the thermal dose and the healing process of soft tissues with low or high water content or with low or high blood perfusion is still under study. Microwave diathermy treatment at 434 and 915 MHz can be effective in the short-term management of musculo-skeletal injuries.

Hyperthermia is safe if the temperature is kept under 45 °C or 113 °F. The absolute temperature is, however, not sufficient to predict the damage that it may produce.

Microwave diathermy-induced hyperthermia produced short-term pain relief in established supraspinatus tendinopathy.

The physical characteristics of most of the devices used clinically to heat tissues have been proved to be inefficient to reach the necessary therapeutic heating patterns in the range of depth of the damage tissue. The preliminary studies performed with new microwave devices working at 434 MHz have demonstrated encouraging results. Nevertheless, adequately designed prospective-controlled clinical studies need to be completed to confirm the therapeutic effectiveness of hyperthermia with large number of patients, longer-term follow-up and mixed populations.

Microwave diathermy is used in the management of superficial tumours with conventional radiotherapy and chemotherapy. Hyperthermia has been used in oncology for more than 35 years, in addition to radiotherapy, in the management of different tumours. In 1994, hyperthermia was introduced in several countries of the European Union as a modality for use in physical medicine and sports traumatology. Its use has been successfully extended to physical medicine and sports traumatology in Central and Southern Europe.

=== Surgery ===
Surgical diathermy is usually better known as "electrosurgery". (It is also referred to occasionally as "electrocautery", but see disambiguation below.) Electrosurgery and surgical diathermy involve the use of high-frequency A.C. electric current in surgery as either a cutting modality, or else to cauterize small blood vessels to stop bleeding. This technique induces localized tissue burning and damage, the zone of which is controlled by the frequency and power of the device.

Some sources insist that electrosurgery be applied to surgery accomplished by high-frequency alternating current (AC) cutting, and that "electrocautery" be used only for the practice of cauterization with heated nichrome wires powered by direct current (DC), as in the handheld battery-operated portable cautery tools.

==== Types ====
Diathermy used in surgery is of typically two types.

- Monopolar, where electric current passes from one electrode near the tissue to be treated to other fixed electrode (indifferent electrode) elsewhere in the body. Usually this type of electrode is placed in contact with buttocks or around the leg.
- Bipolar, where both electrodes are mounted on same pen-like device and electric current passes only through the tissue being treated. Advantage of bipolar electrosurgery is that it prevents the flow of current through other tissues of the body and focuses only on the tissue in contact. This is useful in microsurgery and in patients with a cardiac pacemaker.

== Risks ==
Burns from electrocautery generally arise from a faulty grounding pad or from an outbreak of a fire. Monopolar electrocautery works because radio frequency energy is concentrated by the surgical instrument's small surface area. The electrical circuit is completed by passing current through the patient's body to a conductive pad that is connected to the radio frequency generator. Because the pad's surface area is large relative to the instrument's tip, energy density across the pad is reliably low enough that no tissue injury occurs at the pad site. Electrical shocks and burns are possible, however, if the circuit is interrupted or energy is concentrated in some way. This can happen if the pad surface in contact is small, e.g. if the pad's electrolytic gel is dry, if the pad becomes disconnected from the radio frequency generator, or via a metal implant. Modern electrocautery systems are equipped with sensors to detect high resistance in the circuit that can prevent some injuries.

As with all forms of heat applications, care must be taken to avoid burns during diathermy treatments, especially in patients with decreased sensitivity to heat and cold. Major league baseball star Dale Alexander's career was ended by severe burns occurring during diathermy treatment. With electrocautery there have been reported cases of flash fires in the operating theatre related to heat generation meeting chemical flash points, especially in the presence of increased oxygen concentrations associated with anesthetic.

Concerns have also been raised regarding the toxicity of surgical smoke produced by electrocautery. This has been shown to contain chemicals which may cause harm to patients, surgeons and operating theatre staff.

For patients that have a surgically implanted spinal cord stimulator (SCS) system, diathermy can cause tissue damage through energy that is transferred into the implanted SCS components resulting in severe injury or death.

== Military ==
Medical diathermy devices were used to cause interference to German radio beams used for targeting nighttime bombing raids in World War II during the Battle of the Beams.

== See also ==
- Dielectric heating
- Heat therapy
- Pulsed electromagnetic field therapy
