= Mike Sievert =

American business executive

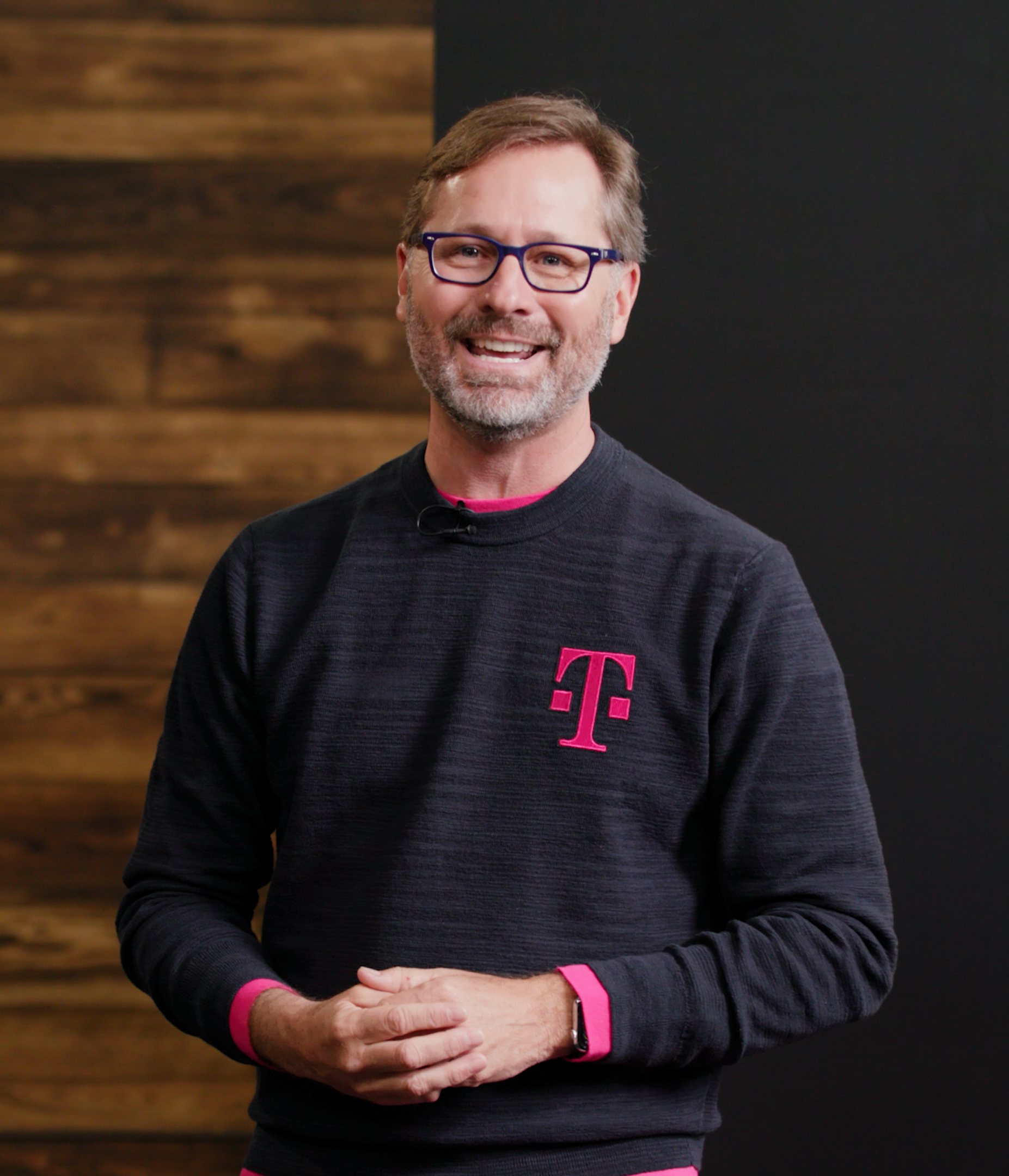
- Sievert in 2021
- Born: May 10, 1969 (age 57); Canton, Ohio, U.S.
- Education: University of Pennsylvania (BA)
- Employer: T-Mobile US
- Title: CEO of T-Mobile
- Term: April 1, 2020 – October 31, 2025
- Predecessor: John Legere
- Successor: Srini Gopalan
- Board member of: Starbucks
- Website: LinkedIn profile

Michael Sievert (born 1969) is an American business executive. He is the former chief executive officer (CEO) and current vice chairman of T-Mobile US. In November 2019, T-Mobile announced that Sievert would be promoted from chief operating officer (COO) to CEO in May 2020 when John Legere stepped down. Sievert took control a month earlier than planned, in April 2020, the same day T-Mobile closed its merger with Sprint.

== Early life and education ==
Sievert was born in Canton, Ohio. At age ten, he became a paper carrier for The Repository, using his earnings to buy a Radio Shack TRS-80 and, later, a Commodore 64. He graduated from GlenOak High School in 1987 and received a bachelor's degree in economics from the Wharton School of the University of Pennsylvania in 1991.

== Career ==
Sievert started his career at Procter & Gamble, where he worked as a brand manager for brands such as Pepto-Bismol and Crest. He subsequently worked at IBM and Clearwire. From 1998 to 2001 he worked as executive vice president (EVP) and chief global marketing and sales officer at the online financial services company E-Trade and CEO of tablet gaming company Discovery Bay Games. From 2002 to 2005, Sievert was EVP and CMO of AT&T Wireless. He joined Microsoft's Global Windows Group as corporate vice president of product management in 2005, leading preparations for the release of Longhorn (later called Windows Vista). In 2008 he co-founded Switchbox Labs, a startup acquired by Lenovo in 2009. In 2012, John Legere, T-Mobile's then-new CEO, hired Sievert as CMO.

Sievert became COO of T-Mobile in 2015, then became the company's president in 2018. He also joined T-Mobile's board of directors in 2018. During this time, Sievert oversaw the "Un-carrier" marketing campaign, which sought to rebrand T-Mobile's public image with a focus on no overage charges, no contracts, unlimited data, and other offerings. In April 2020, on the day T-Mobile's merger with Sprint closed, Sievert succeeded Legere as CEO. At the time, T-Mobile and Sprint were the third- and fourth-largest wireless carriers in the U.S., respectively. Under Sievert's leadership, T-Mobile surpassed 100 million total customers, and created the first nationwide standalone 5G network in the U.S. Sievert has declared his strategy of focusing on dominating in 5G, saying "We're making the rules for the 5G era because we're way ahead — and I mean miles ahead."

In 2017, Sievert joined the board of Canadian company Shaw Communications.

In June 2020, Sievert decided to pull all T-Mobile advertisements from Tucker Carlson Tonight because of rhetoric that criticized the Black Lives Matter movement. When announcing the move, Sievert tweeted, "Bye-bye, Tucker Carlson!" Sievert also published an open letter about T-Mobile's diversity, equity and inclusion programs.

In 2023, Sievert and Mint Mobile owner Ryan Reynolds announced T-Mobile's plans to acquire both Ultra Mobile and Mint Mobile. That same year, Sievert's total compensation at T-Mobile was $37.5 million, up 29% from the previous year and representing a CEO-to-median worker pay ratio of 521-to-1.

In 2024, Starbucks added Sievert to its board of directors. He also delivered the commencement speech at the Wharton School Master of Business Administration graduation ceremony in May 2024.

From 2024 to 2025, Sievert led T‑Mobile in its $4.4 billion acquisition of U.S. Cellular's wireless operations, including more than four million customers and 2,600 towers. Annual revenue increased from $45 billion in 2019 to $81.4 billion in 2024. In September 2025, T-Mobile announced Sievert would step down as CEO and become vice chairman. T-Mobile COO Srini Gopalan became CEO on November 1.

Sievert joined the board of Alaska Air Group in June 2026.

== Personal life ==
Sievert is married and has two adult sons. He lives in Kirkland, Washington.
