= List of companies based in Bellevue, Washington =

This is a list of large or well-known interstate or international companies headquartered in Bellevue, Washington.

== Currently based in Bellevue ==
- 5th Cell - video game developer; created Scribblenauts and Drawn to Life
- Apptio - developer of software used to evaluate and manage portfolios of IT investments through an integrated view of IT cost, performance, supply, and demand
- ArenaNet - PC game developer of Guild Wars series; many ArenaNet employees formerly worked for Blizzard Entertainment
- Baratza - coffee grinder company
- Bungie - video game studio known for the popular Halo and Destiny franchises
- Coinstar - producer of coin exchange kiosks and other coin services
- Concur Technologies - offers online integrated travel and expense management for businesses; relocated its headquarters in 2013 from Redmond to the Key Center building
- Dreambox - online elementary and middle school math software; headquartered in downtown Bellevue
- Eddie Bauer - relocated its headquarters from Redmond to a 28-story office tower at Lincoln Square, which was completed in mid-2007; shares the tower with Microsoft's North American sales headquarters
- Esterline - publicly traded company that designs, manufactures, and markets specialty products primarily for aerospace and defense customers
- Flyhomes - real estate and financial technology company
- GlobalScholar - an operating unit of Scantron
- Intellectual Ventures - a growing intellectual property investment company, prominently featured in the book Superfreakonomics
- Melendez & Associates, Investigations - investigative agency providing services to individuals, law firms and sole practitioner attorneys across the United States and internationally.
- OfferUp - mobile marketplace
- Orahealth Corporation - pharmaceutical manufacturer specializing in oral health care products
- Outerwall - owner and operator of coin-exchanging and movie rental kiosks found in supermarkets
- Paccar - world's third-largest producer of heavy duty Class 8 trucks (semis) sold under the Kenworth, Peterbilt, DAF and Leyland nameplates
- The Pokémon Company International - North American headquarters for US operations for marketing and licensing the Pokémon franchise
- QFC - Quality Food Centers; headquartered in Bellevue; a Washington and Oregon chain of upscale grocery stores (a wholly owned subsidiary of Kroger)
- Savers - operators of the Value Village thrift store chain
- Smartsheet- Software as a service (SaaS) application for collaboration and work management
- Sucker Punch Productions - Sony game developer which produced Sly Cooper, InFamous, and Rocket: Robot on Wheels
- Symetra - life insurance company
- tinyBuild - indie game publisher
- TerraPower - nuclear energy company
- T-Mobile US - headquarters for their US operations are located in Factoria, a neighborhood of Bellevue; operates a nationwide 4G LTE and 5G NR network; Bellevue's second-largest employer, with over 4,800 employees on the campus and America's third largest mobile carrier.
- Valve - computer software/video games developer responsible for PC game client Steam, and best-selling games such as the Half-Life series, Portal series, and Team Fortress 2
- WizKids - non-electronic game developer producing everything from collectible miniatures games to board games

== Branches based in Bellevue ==
- Boeing - aircraft manufacturer's Bellevue's third-largest employer with over 2,800 employees
- HTC Corporation - Taiwan-based manufacturer of smartphones and portable computing devices
- Microsoft - Bellevue's largest employer, with 7,500 employees
- Merrill Lynch - wealth management
- Nokia - Finnish based telecommunication equipment and services provider
- Samsung - multinational conglomerate, primarily electronics
- Salesforce - cloud based CRM solutions provider
- Tata Consultancy Services - is an Indian multinational information technology service and consulting company headquartered in Mumbai, Maharashtra, India. It is a subsidiary of Tata Group; TCS is the largest Indian company by market capitalization.
- Unity Technologies - 2D, 3D and VR Game Engine
