= Un-carrier =

Marketing campaign by T-Mobile

Un-carrier was a marketing campaign created by T-Mobile US with Prophet, and advertising company Publicis. It debuted in March 2013, where the company introduced a new streamlined plan structure for new customers which drops contracts, subsidized phones, coverage fees for data, and early termination fees. Generally, the advertised promotions are permanent, though some become redundant with later uncarrier innovations (for instance, the unlimited music in uncarrier 6 was moot after the move to all unlimited data plans). Occasionally the promotion is dropped all together, such as with T-Mobile's "Mobile Without Borders" feature in UnCarrier 3.0. The feature provided unlimited service to customers visiting in Mexico and Canada. When T-Mobile couldn't continue to support the feature, customers were given 32 days notice that the service promotion ended, and the feature would be removed from all existing accounts. A replacement feature was available, but also required an increase in price by first changing rateplans and adding features for additional fees. T-Mobile announced the change to its customers through a press release.

== Incentives ==
=== Simple Choice plans ===
The contract-free Simple Choice plan, also known as Un-carrier 1.0, debuted in March 2013 by offering unlimited calling and text messaging with 500 MB of unthrottled data monthly for a base price of $50. Options for 2.5 GB or unlimited data were offered for an extra monthly fee. On its first anniversary in March 2014, these amounts were changed to the following: 1 GB, 3 GB, 5 GB or unlimited with the same base prices.

In July 2014, T-Mobile offered a limited time promotion on 4 and 5 line family plans, changing their 1 GB per line unthrottled data to 2.5 GB at no extra cost. Existing customers had to call T-Mobile by the end of September 2014 to benefit from this offer. The data allotment was supposed to automatically revert to 1 GB after January 2, 2016, but never did.

In November 2015, the amounts on 1 GB, 3 GB and 5 GB plans (excluding the 2.5 GB limited time promotion) were doubled to 2 GB, 6 GB and 10 GB respectively for all new and existing customers at no extra cost.

Under the Simple Choice plans, customers pay a portion of their device's price up-front, and pay off the remainder through monthly payments for two years. The cost of that monthly payment depends on the device. The customer fully owns the phone and no longer makes any future payments once they have completed paying off their phone. A second line costs $30 extra, while any additional line beyond this costs $10 extra (before extra data). It is possible to create a family plan by adding lines at a reduced cost.

=== Jump! device upgrade service ===
On July 10, 2013, T-Mobile introduced Un-carrier 2.0 as Jump, a new add-on for its monthly plans which allows customers to upgrade their phone up to two times per year, by trading in their phone to purchase a new one at the same price as a new customer. T-Mobile users with Jump! as of Feb 14th are no longer required to wait 6 months for the first upgrade. AT&T and Verizon require that customers wait 2 years before they can upgrade their phone.

On June 27, 2015, T-Mobile announced Un-carrier Amped 2.0. This is a new JUMP! On Demand program, which permits three upgrades per year instead of the two offered by the original JUMP!. Also, the carrier dropped the $10/month fee for the original JUMP! plan.

=== Simple Global roaming service ===
On October 9, 2013, T-Mobile introduced their third phase of the "Un-carrier", which was the introduction of basically free international roaming. See section Roaming for more information.

On October 23, 2013, T-Mobile announced a Un-carried 3.5 promo offer, which gave customers 200MB of free data for their tablets. They also announced $0 down for most tablets, including the newly to them arrived iPads.

On July 9, 2015, T-Mobile launched Mobile Without Borders to offer high speed data roaming while in Canada and Mexico at no additional cost, in addition to providing unlimited talk and text roaming in these countries via Simple Global. The domestic high speed allowance is used while roaming, after which slower speeds or deprioritization may apply. Furthermore, calls and texts to Canada and Mexico from the U.S. carry no extra fee.

=== Rebates for new customers ===
On January 8, 2014, T-Mobile revealed Un-carrier 4.0. Known as Get Out of Jail Free Card, T-Mobile offered to pay off the Early Termination Fees (ETF), up to $375 per line, for individuals and families who wanted to switch from AT&T, Verizon, or Sprint to T-Mobile. According to T-Mobile, "With an eligible phone trade-in, the total value of the offer to switch to T-Mobile could be as high as $650 per line."

On April 9, 2014, T-Mobile released their first of three parts to their "Un-carrier 4.5" initiative. This was a new, low-cost called "Simple Starter". Like "Simple Choice", it includes unlimited talk and text. The main difference is that "Simple Starter" only included 500 MB of data, after which Internet access was disabled until the next billing cycle or until more access was purchased. Other "Simple Choice" features, such as Simple Global and Music Unleashed, are unavailable on "Simple Starter". This plan was later replaced by a slightly pricier variant, featuring 2 GB of Internet access instead of 500 MB. "Simple Starter" has since been discontinued for new customers.

On April 10, 2014, T-Mobile released their second part of the "Un-carrier 4.5" initiative, specifically for tablets. This included a promotion that, for a limited time, sold tablets with built-in 4G LTE modems at the same price as a tablet without said modem. The initiative also included the ETF payoff program extending to tablet customers. The final part was a promotional price for mobile Internet.

On April 14, 2014, T-Mobile announced their final part to their "Un-carrier 4.5" initiative. T-Mobile abolished overages for all T-Mobile customers on all plans, current and grandfathered. CEO John Legere also started a petition to other carriers to do the same.

=== T-Mobile Trial ===
On June 18, 2014, T-Mobile announced its Un-carrier 5.0 incentive. Initially marketed as Test Drive, it allowed new customers to test out T-Mobile's network on a loaner iPhone 5S for a week at no charge. This offer is limited to once per household per year. Apple has provided T-Mobile with free iPhones for this promotion. Test Drive was later replaced with T-Mobile Trial, which allows eligible users to activate a temporary T-Mobile line via eSIM on a compatible unlocked device while retaining their existing service and phone number with another carrier. The trial period typically lasts up to 30 days and includes unlimited high-speed data, enabling prospective customers to evaluate the network before deciding whether to switch.

=== Music Freedom ===
In conjunction with the T-Mobile Trial announcement, the provider also announced its Un-carrier 6.0 incentive, Music Freedom. With a Simple Choice plan, data used on certain streaming music services would no longer count to users' data limits. At the time of the announcement, these services included Pandora, Spotify, Rhapsody, Google Play Music, iTunes Radio, Slacker, Milk Music, Beatport, and iHeartRadio. In addition, users are also able to vote for more music services to be selected for inclusion into this program. T-Mobile has partnered with Rhapsody to offer "UnRadio", a streaming radio service with unlimited skips, no ads, and offline playback. The service will be free to unlimited T-Mobile customers, and will be available to all others for a nominal fee, which varies between T-Mobile and non-T-Mobile customers. On November 24, 2014, this was expanded to add an additional 14 music services.

Music Freedom was exclusive to Simple Choice, and it was not available on newer plans. The incentive was later replaced with various music-based offers for T-Mobile, Metro and legacy Sprint customers.

=== In-Flight Connection ===
On September 10, 2014, T-Mobile debuted Un-carrier 7.0 as Wi-Fi Unleashed. The company announced an agreement with Gogo Inflight Internet to provide free text messages and visual voicemail to T-Mobile customers on Gogo-equipped U.S. flights. Second, all customers were made eligible to upgrade to a device that supports Wi-Fi Calling. Third, the T-Mobile Personal CellSpot home router allows users to make calls from their home using their broadband connection.

This service was later replaced with T-Mobile In-Flight Connection, available on selected plans. In-Flight Connection includes unlimited messaging and visual voicemail, with some flights also offering unlimited video streaming on supported services.

=== Rollover data ===
On December 16, 2014, T-Mobile announced Un-carrier 8.0 as Data Stash. This allowed Simple Choice users on specific points to carry over unused high-speed data usage for up to one year. On March 16, 2015, T-Mobile announced that Data Stash was extended to Simple Choice prepaid customers. This incentive was later discontinued.

=== Incentives for business customers ===
On March 18, 2015, T-Mobile announced their Uncarrier 9.0 initiative. Called Un-carrier for Business, it brought a simple pricing structure to business customers where "every line comes with unlimited talk and text, as well as 1 GB of data and depending on how many lines you get, the price you pay per line changes. But not by much." Families of business customers can also get up to 50% discount on their phone lines.

"Un-carrier for Business" also offered bespoke business tools to help customers mobilize their business. The tools included a free .com domain name, a free mobile optimized website, and email address.

On March 18, 2015, T-Mobile announced their new business initiatives, including simplified pricing, a special 24/7 business support team, and extending existing un-carrier benefits (global roaming, WiFi calling and texting for compatible devices, free in-flight texting, etc.) to business lines. Families of employees can also receive discounts through this program.

T-Mobile also emphasized a dramatic coverage expansion initiative for 2015, planning to reach an additional 1 million square miles of native coverage in the lower 48 states, and expanded their "Contract Freedom" (now called "Carrier Freedom") promotion to cover device and lease payoffs.

T-Mobile additionally announced that its customers' prices they pay are good forever, as long as they keep service on their lines, including if they utilize promotional pricing.

=== Unlimited video streaming ===
On November 10, 2015, T-Mobile introduced Un-carrier X, with Binge On, where watching videos on certain streaming services doesn't count against a user's 4G LTE data if the user has at least 3 GB of 4G LTE data. For all Simple Choice plans, most videos are automatically streamed in DVD (480p or higher) quality, allowing customers to watch as much as three times more video than before. Also, all 4G LTE data amounts were doubled.

Binge On is exclusive to Simple Choice, and it is not available on newer plans.

=== T-Mobile Tuesdays ===
On June 6, 2016, T-Mobile announced T-Mobile Tuesdays. This program has exclusive promotions offered to T-Mobile customers with a variety of rewards, ranging from free food from Domino's, Pizza Hut, Krispy Kreme, Burger King, Jimmy John's, Shake Shack, Subway, Wendy's, Popeyes, and Firehouse, Vudu and Redbox movies, Topgolf credits, Lyft credits, Shell fuel discounts, StubHub ticket discounts, and Fandango movie tickets. The signature for this promotion is "Get Thanked", in which the carrier offered a subtle way to say thank you to their customers every Tuesday. Additionally, this promotion carried another incentive called "Stock Up". T-Mobile offered one share of T-Mobile stock for every new customer an existing customer refers to T-Mobile, up to 100 shares. Customers who had been with the company for five years or more were offered two stocks for every new customer they referred to T-Mobile.

Beginning on June 13, T-Mobile also offered one free hour of in-flight Wi-Fi through Gogo Inflight Internet for consumers who fly through sponsored airlines. Adding to a previous Un-Carrier launch, data-dependent texting such as iMessage, Viber, Google Hangouts, and WhatsApp was able to be used for free on flights with Gogo Inflight Internet.

T-Mobile Tuesdays saw a much higher than anticipated volume within the first few weeks of its debut. Domino's saw nearly quadruple their normal volume of sales on Tuesday. There were so many pizzas ordered from Domino's Pizza that Domino's had to back out of the promotional offers featured in T-Mobile Tuesdays.

As of September 1, customers from T-Mobile have redeemed over 14 million free gifts and allowed promotional partners to find success. Mobile travel application Hotel Tonight topped the trending chart on Google Play and technology operating company Bookshout topped the Books category in the iOS App Store during their respective promotional periods.

=== T-Mobile ONE plan ===
On August 18, 2016, T-Mobile announced T-Mobile ONE. T-Mobile ONE was a step towards ending data plans, making all talk, text and all data usage unlimited (video data unlimited at 480p definition, with an extra fee for unlimited HD). As with T-Mobile Simple Choice, subscribers using the most data, the highest 3% – currently people using more than 50 GB of high-speed data per month – may see their data traffic prioritized behind other users once they cross that threshold during their billing month.

=== Un-carrier Next ===
On January 6, 2017, T-Mobile presented its latest un-carrier 'un-carrier next' at CES in Las Vegas, Nevada. CEO John Legere and COO Mike Sievert announced several 'new rules'. The first was to eliminate wireless service and access fees in an effort to make the pricing more transparent. The prices for all T-Mobile service plans will now be exactly as advertised without any additional or hidden fees. The second rule introduced was the 'kickback' program. Individuals and families on the T-Mobile One plan who use less than 2GB of data a month will receive a $10 statement credit. The third rule introduced gives customers the guarantee that no aspects of their particular plan will change unless they amend them. In effect, T-Mobile 'signed' a contract stipulating they will not alter any of the service plans. Finally the fourth item introduced was to simplify their offerings. T-Mobile will only offer the T-Mobile One unlimited plan to new customers beginning January 22, 2017. On April 22, 2025, T-Mobile introduced new plans that no longer included these taxes and fees. Older plans are not available for new customers.

=== Un-Carrier Scam Shield ===
On July 16, 2020, Mike Sievert unveiled presented via webcast, the company's latest Un-carrier move to provide free scam blocking. This offering includes free caller ID and call blocking, and a free second "proxy" number to filter out scam calls from coming to personal phone lines. Scams and unwanted robocalls are the top complaint to the Federal Communications Commission costing Americans more than $1 billion a year.
