= Assurance Wireless =

American mobile network provider

Assurance Wireless USA, L.P.
- Type: Subsidiary
- Industry: Telecommunications
- Founded: December 31, 2009; 16 years ago
- Headquarters: Warren Township, New Jersey, United States
- Area served: Contiguous United States
- Products: Wireless plans, Mobile phones
- Number of employees: 500 (2009)
- Parent: Virgin Mobile (2009-2020); T-Mobile (2020-present)
- Website: assurancewireless.com

Assurance Wireless USA, L.P. is a telephone service subsidized by the federal Lifeline Assistance program, a government benefit program supported by the federal Universal Service Fund. The service provides to low-income eligible people a free phone, free monthly data, unlimited texting, and free monthly minutes. Assurance Wireless users do not receive a bill, are not required to sign a contract, and do not pay activation fees or recurring fees. Founded in 2009, Assurance Wireless has used the T-Mobile network for coverage since 2020.

According to Hotspot Setup, "the two largest providers of free mobile phones are Safelink Wireless and Assurance Wireless, which are available in more states than other providers." Assurance Wireless users may bring their own unlocked device as they are not required to use an Assurance issued wireless phone.

== Eligibility ==
By meeting certain income requirements or by qualifying for certain federal and/or state assistance programs, US citizens are entitled to enroll for the free phone and monthly service. One phone per household is allowed and at least one call or text per 30-day period with the phone is required to maintain service.

As of 2024, Assurance Wireless service is available to qualifying residents in the Contiguous United States including Washington, D.C.

== Ownership ==
Since April 2020, the Assurance Wireless brand has been under the T-Mobile family. This was the result of the merger of Sprint Corporation and T-Mobile US was officially completed, and after Virgin Mobile USA was officially shut down and folded into Boost Mobile. On July 14, 2020, an official statement was sent to all customers, stating that all customers would continue to have the same minutes, data, and service, but now on the T-Mobile network.

Before the merger in 2019, T-Mobile President Mike Sievert said in a statement to USA Today, "The digital divide is real and we want to help eliminate it. We have pledged that the new T-Mobile will maintain the existing T-Mobile and Sprint Lifeline program throughout the country indefinitely, barring fundamental changes to today's program."

== Pre-installed software ==
In 2019, it was discovered that cell phones being sold by Assurance Wireless came with unremovable Chinese malware preinstalled.
