= Srini Gopalan =

British Indian business executive

- Born: Srinivasan Gopalan; 1969 or 1970 (age 55–56)
- Citizenship: British
- Education: St. Stephen's College, Delhi; Delhi University; IIM Ahmedabad
- Occupation: Business executive
- Title: CEO of T-Mobile since November 2025
- Predecessor: Mike Sievert

Srini Gopalan (born 1970) is a British business executive of Indian origin who is the president and chief executive officer (CEO) of T-Mobile US. Gopalan had previously worked at Deutsche Telekom, Vodafone, and Bharti Airtel.

== Early life and education ==
Gopalan did his schooling from DPS R. K. Puram in New Delhi. He graduated from St Stephen's College of Delhi University and did his post-graduation in management from IIM Ahmedabad.

== Career ==
Gopalan worked in Unilever India and Accenture at the start of his career. He joined Capital One in the UK in 1999. Gopalan rose to the position of managing director of Capital One, UK. After a decade with Capital One, Gopalan joined T-Mobile UK as the Chief Marketing Officer. He was involved in the joint venture between T-Mobile UK and Orange that resulted in EE. Following this stint, Gopalan was with Vodafone UK for three years and thereafter, he worked at Bharti Airtel for three years — in the capacity of Consumer Director in both companies.

Gopalan was with Deutsche Telekom from 2016 to 2025 where he first oversaw the company's business in European countries. He became the Board member for Germany at Deutsche Telekom in 2020. Gopalan became chief operating officer (COO) of T-Mobile US in March 2025; in September 2025, the company named Gopalan as its next CEO, succeeding Mike Sievert, effective November 1.

== Personal life ==
Gopalan is married and lives in Bellevue, Washington.
