= Merger of Sprint Corporation and T-Mobile US =

Events and timeline

Merger of Sprint and T-Mobile

- T-Mobile & Sprint before the merger.

- Logo of Sprint & T-Mobile until August 2020.
- Initiator: T-Mobile US
- Target: Sprint Corporation
- Type: Merger
- Cost: US$26 billion (all shares deal)
- Initiated: April 29, 2018; 8 years ago
- Completed: April 1, 2020; 6 years ago

Sprint Corporation and T-Mobile US merged in 2020 in an all shares deal for $26 billion. The deal was announced on April 29, 2018. After a nearly two-year-long approval process the merger was closed on April 1, 2020, with T-Mobile emerging as the surviving brand. The Sprint brand was discontinued by T-Mobile on August 2, 2020.

== Preliminary discussions and announcement ==
=== Sprint targeting T-Mobile US ===
In December 2013, multiple reports indicated that Sprint Corporation and its parent company, SoftBank, were working towards a deal to acquire a majority stake in T-Mobile US for at least US$20 billion. The proposed merger would have further bolstered T-Mobile's position in the overall market and resulted in the country's major national carriers being controlled by only three companies. Members of the government were skeptical that such an acquisition would be approved by regulators, citing antitrust concerns and an explicit goal by FCC chairman Tom Wheeler to maintain four national carriers in the United States. On April 30, 2014, Bloomberg reported that Sprint was in talks with its lenders to ensure that the company would be financially prepared for the bid, then valued at $24 billion and planned for "summer 2014". It was also reported that due to his success within the company, then T-Mobile CEO John Legere was the top contender to be named CEO of a merged Sprint/T-Mobile and that Sprint had insisted on a low termination fee to prevent regulators from being given an incentive to block the deal, as had occurred with AT&T's failed attempt to purchase T-Mobile.

On August 1, 2014, Xavier Niel's Iliad SA publicly announced a $16 billion all-cash counter-bid to acquire a 56% stake in T-Mobile US and to be funded using equity and debt. Iliad is the parent company of French carrier Free Mobile, which had, like T-Mobile, undertaken disruptive business moves to undercut its competitors, triggering a "price war" among them upon its launch in 2012. Credit Suisse analysts felt that the bid would not be attractive to the company's current shareholders due to its lower value in comparison to Sprint's bid, but could "put pressure on Sprint to move sooner rather [than] later."

On August 4, 2014, Bloomberg reported that Sprint had abandoned its bid to acquire T-Mobile, considering the unlikelihood that such a deal would be approved by the U.S. government and its regulators.

=== T-Mobile targeting Sprint ===
On February 17, 2017, Reuters reported that Softbank was considering selling its majority stake in Sprint to Deutsche Telekom (an effective reversal of the original deal), citing struggling growth in the U.S. market, and a higher likelihood that the deal would be approved by the Trump administration. However, after months of speculation and rumors about a potential deal being reached, both T-Mobile and Sprint announced on November 4, 2017, that while they have had discussions about a possible merger, the two parties had decided to end merger talks due to not being able to agree on the terms of the deal, due to Softbank's board of directors reported vote on October 27 where they decided not to give up control of Sprint.

=== Announcement ===
Sprint and T-Mobile once again resumed talks of a merger in April 2018 and announced a merger agreement on April 29.

== Approval process ==
=== Reception ===
==== Support ====
On September 21, 2018, Tracfone Wireless voiced its support for the merger. They stated "With the merger of T-Mobile and Sprint, and the resulting more rapid deployment of a nationwide 5G network with broader coverage, greater capacity, higher throughput and lower latency, the wholesale market place will be more competitive with three full service competitors, rather than two. The increase in competition should have the greatest effect in rural areas. The resulting excess capacity would be available for MVNOs in these areas as a third option that has not been available in the current marketplace.”

On June 28, 2019, FCC Chairman Ajit Pai voiced his support for the merger. He discussed 5G and how the FCC is working to accelerate its deployment in the U.S. One of the pillars of T-Mobile and Sprint's merger is how they plan to use their combined spectrum to deploy a nationwide 5G network, and he said during his remarks that “one of the most critical steps that the FCC can take is to approve the T-Mobile/Sprint transaction." He went on to say that Sprint has much mid-band spectrum, but that “the company standing alone does not have the capacity to deploy 5G in this spectrum throughout large parts of rural America.” The combined T-Mobile-Sprint will have the capacity to do that, he claimed, pointing to a T-Mobile and Sprint commitment to deploy mid-band 5G to 88 percent of the U.S. population, including two-thirds of rural consumers. “We should seize the opportunity to provide 5G to rural America and close the digital divide,” he said.

==== Opposition ====
On August 28, 2018, the Communications Workers of America (CWA) said that it opposed the merger between T-Mobile and Sprint in the proposed set up. The CWA, a union that represents 700,000 workers, claimed that the merger would result in more than 28,000 jobs being lost, a number that it said it came to by performing an analysis based on location data for all of the retail locations involved in the proposed merger. They stated that the merger which raised competitive and national security concerns, would lead to loss of jobs, and that both companies would be liable to build out nationwide 5G on their own.

Dish Network initially opposed the merger prior to its deal to buy Boost Mobile when the deal was closed. They voiced their opposition multiple times, stating that data from other countries that experienced four-to-three times reductions in the number of carriers to saying that the T-Mobile-Sprint merger could lead to an increase in prices, not a decrease like T-Mobile has claimed.

On December 13, 2018, an opposition group was formed called "4Competition Coalition" which was used to voice a combined voice of opposition between many companies and organizations. In addition to the CWA and Dish Network, these included the AFL-CIO, Common Cause, C Spire, Fight for the Future, New America's Open Technology Institute, NTCA - The Rural Broadband Association, Open Markets Institute, Public Knowledge, Rural Wireless Association, the Greenlining Institute, and Writers Guild of America West.

=== Regulatory approval ===
On June 18, 2018, Sprint and T-Mobile filed documents with the FCC, which opened the transaction for public commentary and set the stage for the agency to either issue a red light or a green light on the merger. FCC docket 18-197 would be the official home for documents relating to the proposed merger. FCC granted their request to withhold "competitively sensitive information" from the proceeding, which was filed in a separate filing.

On April 29, 2019, completion of the merger was extended from April 29, 2019, to July 29, due to the U.S. Department of Justice Antitrust Division's chief saying that he had not decided whether to approve the merger or not.

On July 26, 2019, the U.S. Department of Justice approved T-Mobile's $26 billion merger with Sprint after the two carriers reached an agreement to sell Boost Mobile, Virgin Mobile (both owned by Sprint), and Sprint's branded prepaid business for $1.4 billion to Dish Network. They would also sell to Dish $3.6 billion of 800 MHz spectrum, Sprint's entire 800 MHz portfolio. Both deals were contingent on final regulatory approval of the merger from the FCC, California Public Utilities Commission, and state AGs (or loss of lawsuit); the Spectrum sale would be completed 3 years after the closure of the merger to allow time for Sprint legacy network customers to switch to the new T-Mobile network.

On October 18, 2019, the merger received formal approval by the FCC in a 3–2 vote.

On November 5, 2019, the FCC officially approved the merger on specific conditions. These conditions include 5G being deployed to 97% of Americans within 3 years of the merger closing, and 90% of Americans having access to speeds of 100 Mbit/s or greater. The merger was not yet closed, as they still needed to win or bypass the lawsuit from the state AGs and get approval from the California PUC. John Legere (T-Mobile's CEO) expected the merger to be completed in early 2020.

On April 1, 2020, Judge Timothy Kelly completed his Tunney Act review of the merger and DOJ settlement, finding no antitrust concerns and approving the merger. This was the final federal regulatory proceeding they needed completed before closing.

=== Lawsuit from State AGs ===
On June 11, 2019, several news outlets reported that the proposed merger between Sprint and T-Mobile was facing a major legal challenge as ten attorneys general from nine states (New York, California, Connecticut, Colorado, Maryland, Michigan, Mississippi, Virginia, and Wisconsin) and Washington, D.C., filed suit to block the merger, alleging it would result in higher prices for consumers to the extent of $4.5 billion annually. It was then reported on June 13, 2019, that Judge Victor Marrero of the United States District Court for the Southern District of New York (SDNY) had set a pre-trial hearing for the week of June 17, 2019, for the merger.

On June 21, 2019, it was reported that four more states — Hawaii, Massachusetts, Minnesota, and Nevada — had joined the lawsuit seeking to block the merger.

On February 11, 2020, SDNY Judge Victor Marrero officially announced his decision in the aforementioned state AG lawsuit siding with Sprint and T-Mobile, officially giving federal district court approval to the merger. He stated that "the merger is not likely to substantially lessen competition like the suing state AGs had claimed it would" and also that Sprint "does not have a sustainable long-term competitive strategy [to remain a viable competitor]."

=== Settlements, agreements, and final changes ===
On October 18, 2019, T-Mobile signed diversity agreements with various civil rights groups as part of the merger.

On February 13, 2020, it was reported that Deutsche Telekom wanted to renegotiate the price of the deal as Sprint's share have been trading below what they were when the deal was first agreed upon, discussions are expected to start soon.

On February 16, 2020, New York Attorney General Letitia James announced that she would not appeal the court's decision in favor of the merger. Rather than appeal, James says she would like to work with the carriers to help consumers get the best service and prices. She stated, “After a thorough analysis, New York has decided not to move forward with an appeal in this case. Instead, we hope to work with all the parties to ensure that consumers get the best pricing and service possible, that networks are built out throughout our state, and that good-paying jobs are created here in New York.” This is significant because she was one of the two leaders in the lawsuit, the other being California Attorney General Xavier Becerra.

On February 20, 2020, T-Mobile and Sprint announced a new Business Combination Agreement, renegotiated due to the fact that Sprint's churn has risen and average revenue per user has fallen since the merger was first announced. The new BCA gives an exchange ratio of 11.00 Sprint shares for each T-Mobile share, up from the original agreement of 9.75 Sprint shares. SoftBank, Sprint's owner, has agreed to surrender 48.8 million T-Mobile shares acquired in the merger to the New T-Mobile, making SoftBank's effective ratio of 11.31 shares per T-Mobile share. Sprint shareholders other than SoftBank will continue to get the original fixed exchange ratio of 0.10256 T-Mobile shares for each Sprint share, or the equivalent of 9.75 Sprint shares for each T-Mobile share. Following the closing of the merger, T-Mobile parent company Deutsche Telekom will hold approximately 43% of New T-Mobile's shares while SoftBank will hold 24% and the remaining 33% will be held by public shareholders. The previous deal saw DT getting 42%, SoftBank getting 27%, and public shareholders getting 31%. The new agreement had an outside/long stop date of July 1, 2020, which is when either and/or both parties can walk away from the deal if it has not closed yet.

On March 11, 2020, California Attorney General Xavier Becerra announced he will not appeal the judge's decision made during the previous month to reject the state AGs’ lawsuit against the T-Mobile-Sprint merger. He, instead, struck a settlement with the defending parties. The terms of the settlement include making its low-cost T-Mobile Connect plans available in California for at least 5 years, that T-Mobile customers can keep their T-Mobile plans held in February 2019 for a total of five years, to enact Project 10 Million, part of the New T-Mobile Un-carrier 1.0 move, that will offer a free hotspot device and 100 GB of free broadband internet per year for five years to 10 million low-income households, for all current T-Mobile and Sprint employees in California must receive an offer of “substantially similar employment” with New T-Mobile, to make the number of New T-Mobile employees in California will be equal to or greater than the current number of T-Mobile and Sprint employees, to open a new customer support center in Kingsburg, CA that will create approximately 1,000 new jobs, to increase participation in employee Diversity and Inclusion program to 60% within 3 years, and to reimburse California and other states that participated in merger lawsuit for the costs of the investigation and litigation, up to a total of $15 million. This is significant because he was the last of the two leaders in the lawsuit, the other being New York Attorney General Letitia James.

==== California Public Utilities Commission ====
Also on March 11, 2020, the California Public Utilities Commission announced a proposal to approve the merger. The conditions of approval include to provide 5G wireless service with speeds of at least 100 Mbit/s to 99 percent of California's population by the end of 2026; to provide 5G wireless service with speeds of at least 100 Mbit/s to 85 percent of California's rural population, and speeds of at least 50 Mbit/s available to 94 percent of California's rural population, by the end of 2026; to have fixed home Internet access available to at least 2.3 million California households, of which at least 123,000 are rural households, within six years of closing; for no retail price increases for at least three years; to offer the low-income California LifeLine program for as long as it operates in California, and enroll at least 300,000 new LifeLine customers; to increase jobs in California by at least 1,000 compared to the total number of current Sprint and T-Mobile employees; to establish the capability to serve all customers for at least 72 hours (i.e., have back-up power) after an emergency event or a utility Public Safety Power Shut-off; and finally other important commitments relating to diversity, reporting, and rural infrastructure deployment, among other topics. This is not a "formal" approval however, as that requires a vote.

When the merger closed on April 1, 2020, the merger had not been approved by the California Public Utilities Commission. This could have led to several implications to the combined business, ranging from litigation to inability to combine operations in California. The CPUC released an order stating that they cannot begin the merger of their California operations until after the CPUC issues a final decision on the pending application, scheduled for the April 16 Voting Meeting. Mike Sievert, new T-Mobile's CEO, stated that he has the view that “the Commission lacks jurisdiction over this transaction” and that T-Mobile believes that the FCC has exclusive authority to approve wireless deals.

On April 16, 2020, the CPUC formally voted and unanimously approved the merger. The merger was approved on the conditions stated in the above section. This was the final state or federal regulatory hurdle in the merger, although the merger was already closed when this approval occurred. Still, this does mean the two companies can combine all operations in California without risk of further litigation, so long as the conditions are met.

== Closure ==
The deal officially closed on April 1, 2020. The companies have stated that, over time, the two brands will integrate into one to consumers, and they will release further information as that happens. Leadership, ownership, and stock trading for the two companies has changed immediately, however. This included CEO John Legere stepping down immediately at close, one month prior to when he was slated to exit the role, making Mike Sievert President and CEO of the combined company.

== Integration ==
=== Network integration ===
On April 21, 2020, T-Mobile officially started customer side changes after the merger, the first change being network related. They officially launched their 2.5 GHz 5G NR network using the spectrum they acquired from the merger in Philadelphia, shutting down the network to Sprint subscribers. They also stated that wherever Sprint's 2.5 GHz network is live: Atlanta, Chicago, Dallas–Fort Worth, Houston, Kansas City, Los Angeles, New York, Phoenix, and Washington, DC; they intend to switch to T-Mobile brand (NY being next) and cut off Sprint's subscribers access to said network. T-Mobile did state that for now, legacy Sprint customers using first gen 5G devices can still access the network until it's switched over using their current 5G devices, and once the switch happens these devices will just switch over to only using 4G LTE. They did state these customers will have an "incentive deal" to switch over to a T-Mobile branded 5G device when these switches occur.

Another customer change announced this day, also network related, was that T-Mobile is also enabling Sprint customers with compatible 4G LTE phones to roam on T-Mobile's LTE network when they leave an area with Sprint LTE coverage. This gives those Sprint customers access to more than double the LTE sites of Sprint's network alone if they have a device compatible with T-Mobile's LTE network. They also stated all Sprint subscribers will soon have access to the entire network (regardless of roaming or not) but did not give details on that further, and it will most likely require a device and/or SIM card change.

On July 2, 2020, T-Mobile confirmed that it had officially shut down the entire Sprint 5G network to legacy Sprint customers. As stated above, T-Mobile has deactivated Sprint's 2.5 GHz 5G service so that it can refarm that spectrum for use on its own network. Any Sprint customer with a Samsung Galaxy S20 5G will have access to the new T-Mobile 5G network, but all other legacy Sprint customers will have to upgrade to a new device to continue having access to 5G, otherwise their current device will run on LTE only. T-Mobile did offer a trade in deal to upgrade to a new device for legacy Sprint 5G customers.

=== Job cuts and creations ===
On June 16, 2020, T-Mobile announced that it was laying off hundreds of Sprint employees. The employees that are being let go will have their jobs until August 13 and are getting severance packages that are reportedly worth around two weeks’ pay for each year on the job. According to James Kirby, the leader that told these employees about their layoff, these Sprint workers are being laid off to make room for 200 new positions inside the merged T-Mobile. T-Mobile did originally claim the merger would create, not eliminate jobs. However, T-Mobile did state after this announcement that it's begun a hiring initiative to add 5,000 new jobs over the next year. These jobs will include departments like Retail, Care, T-Mobile for Business, Engineering, and network organizations, and these layoffs were to streamline employees where customers need them most. The employees were also encouraged to apply for these new positions.

=== Customer offerings ===
On June 18, 2020, T-Mobile extended the T-Mobile Tuesdays benefit to all Sprint postpaid customers.

On July 16, 2020, T-Mobile launched Scam Shield, a service to protect customers from phone scammers.

On July 22, 2020, T-Mobile announced new 5G unlimited tariff plans for T-Mobile US and Sprint customers with aggressive pricing.

=== Rebranding ===
On July 16, 2020, T-Mobile announced that the Sprint brand would be officially discontinued on August 2, 2020. On this date all retail, customer service, and all other company branding would switch to the T-Mobile brand.

The Sprint brand was officially amalgamated into T-Mobile on August 2, 2020.

== Compliance with regulatory obligations and litigation ==
=== Dish ===
On July 1, 2020, Dish Network officially purchased Boost Mobile per their agreement with the companies and the United States' Department of Justice. The purchase was valued at $1.4B and transferred 9.3 million customers. The intent of the US government was for Dish to erect a new nationwide wireless mobile network in order to compensate for reduced competition following the Sprint–T-Mobile merger.

However, in the years following the transaction Dish failed to sufficiently grow Boost Mobile's subscriber base and in 2025 announced that it will decommission its 5G network infrastructure, sell most of its wireless spectrum assets to AT&T, and shift Boost Mobile's operating model from a facilities-based network to a mobile virtual network, with its subscribers being hosted on AT&T's wireless network.

=== California Public Utilities Commission ===
On June 23, 2020, it was announced that T-Mobile sent a letter to the CPUC to ask to ease some of the conditions on their ruling to their approval of the merger, with the first being the requirement that T-Mobile provide 5G speeds of at least 300 Mbit/s to 93 percent of California's population by the end of 2024. T-Mobile says that that should be pushed back to 2026. T-Mobile stated that 2024 date was a proxy for a period ending 6 years after the merger closed, but the deal's regulatory process began in 2018 and didn't actually close until 2020, so T-Mobile wants it pushed back 2 years. Secondly, T-Mobile also says that the 300 Mbit/s/2024 condition is “out of sync” with the other requirements. For example, one condition requires T-Mobile offer speeds of 100 Mbit/s to at least 86 percent of California's population by the end of 2023, then T-Mobile is required to triple those speeds to 300 Mbit/s for 93 percent of the population in just one year. Then T-Mobile is expected to have speeds of at least 100 Mbit/s for 99 percent of California's population by the end of 2026. T-Mo wants to move the 300 Mbit/s requirement to the end of 2026 to “avoid anomalous results”. Lastly, T-Mobile wants to make to the CPUC's conditions is the requirement that within 3 years, the carrier add 1,000 new jobs in California compared to the number of T-Mobile and Sprint employees at the time of the CPUC's approval. Instead, T-Mobile wants the requirement to be that it will have the same number of employees 3 years after the merger closure than it did when it closed.
