= TU (union) =

Trade union

T-Mobile Workers United (TU)
- T-Mobile Workers United (TU)
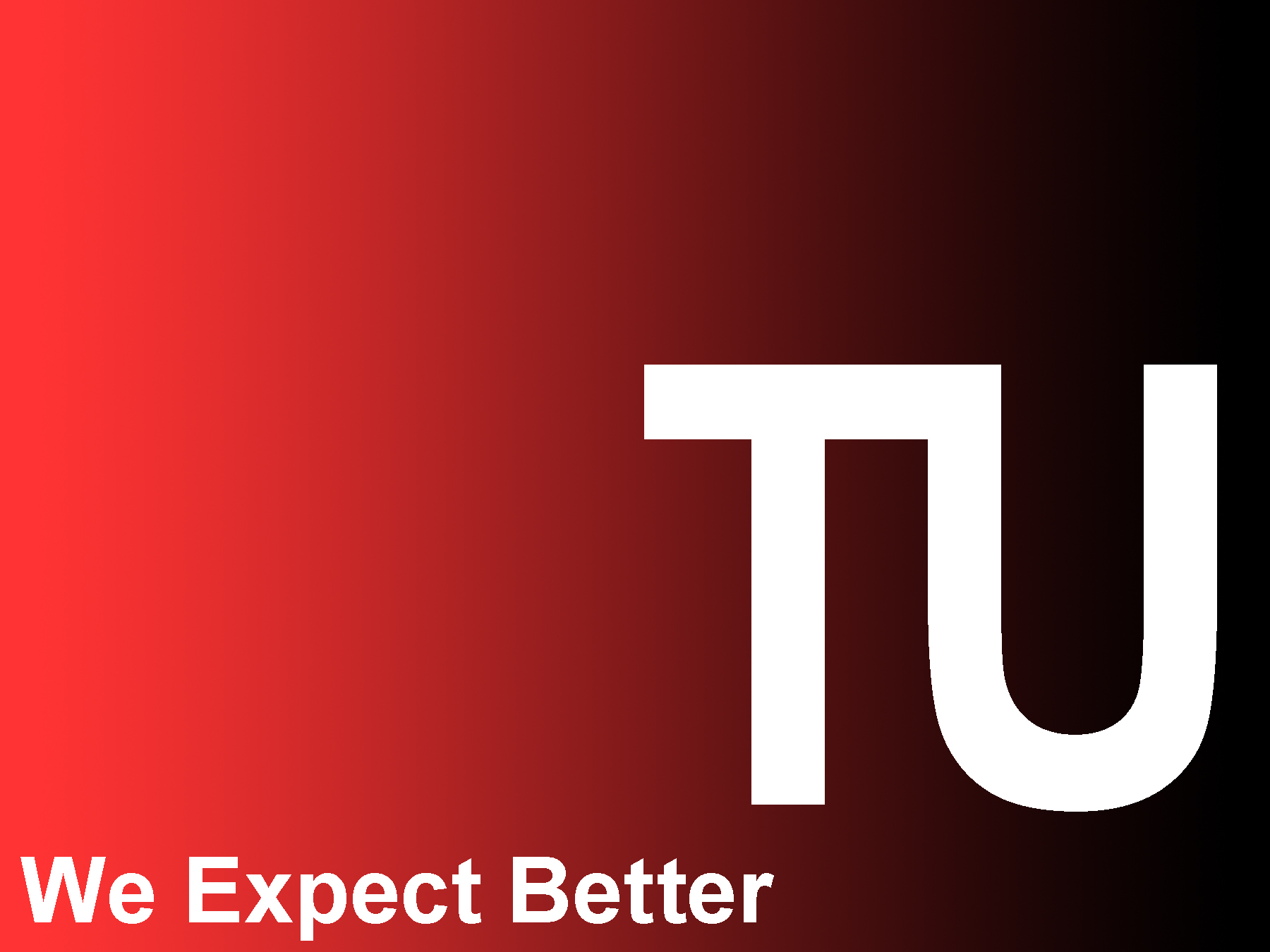
- Founded: 2008
- Location: United States, Germany
- Affiliations: CWA, Ver.di
- Website: tmobileworkersunited.org

T-Mobile Workers United (TU) is an organization of T-Mobile USA and Metro by T-Mobile employees joining together for a voice and fair treatment at work. It represents currently 500 members and is affiliated with the Communications Workers of America (CWA) and Vereinte Dienstleistungsgewerkschaft (ver.di), a large German service-sector union. TU is also supported by a coalition of community and labor groups around the world.

In July 2011, technicians in Connecticut voted for representation by the Communications Workers of America-TU (CWA-TU). On September 25, 2013, MetroPCS workers in Harlem, NY, voted for a union voice and representation by CWA-TU.

== History ==
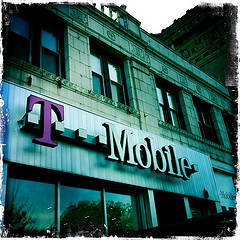
A T-Mobile store in Brooklyn, NY

T-Mobile US is a subsidiary of Deutsche Telekom, the largest telecommunications company in Europe. Through its subsidiary companies, Deutsche Telekom has operations in around 50 countries worldwide. In Germany, Austria, and the Netherlands, employees are represented by trade unions.

When Deutsche Telekom purchased VoiceStream Wireless in 2001, the CWA helped the company gain approval for access to the U.S. market, with the expectation that Deutsche Telekom would be open to letting employees freely choose union representation in the United States.

The relationship between CWA and T-Mobile US has since eroded. Since it entered the American market in 2001, T-Mobile US has been repeatedly criticized for its employment relations by CWA, ver.di, and other groups. Likewise, American Rights at Work and Human Rights Watch have issued studies of union intolerance at the company’s facilities.

In April 2008, CWA and ver.di formed a joint organization for T-Mobile workers named TU. The new organization was "formed with the goal of overcoming the double standard of Deutsche Telekom recognizing labor rights in Germany but ignoring them in the U.S. This new global union is an effective answer to cross-border investment and the globalization of work."

When CWA and ver.di created the joint organization, they originally named it “T-Union”. However, Deutsche Telekom threatened to sue the organizations for trademark infringement, since they had trademarked the concept of branding their services with a leading "T-" (as they did with the color magenta). So, CWA and ver.di had to rename the union TU for T-Mobile Workers Union.

In August, 2013, TU launched a new website that allows workers at T-Mobile and MetroPCS to connect with each other to build strength in their drive for workplace justice and respect.

== TU Affiliates ==
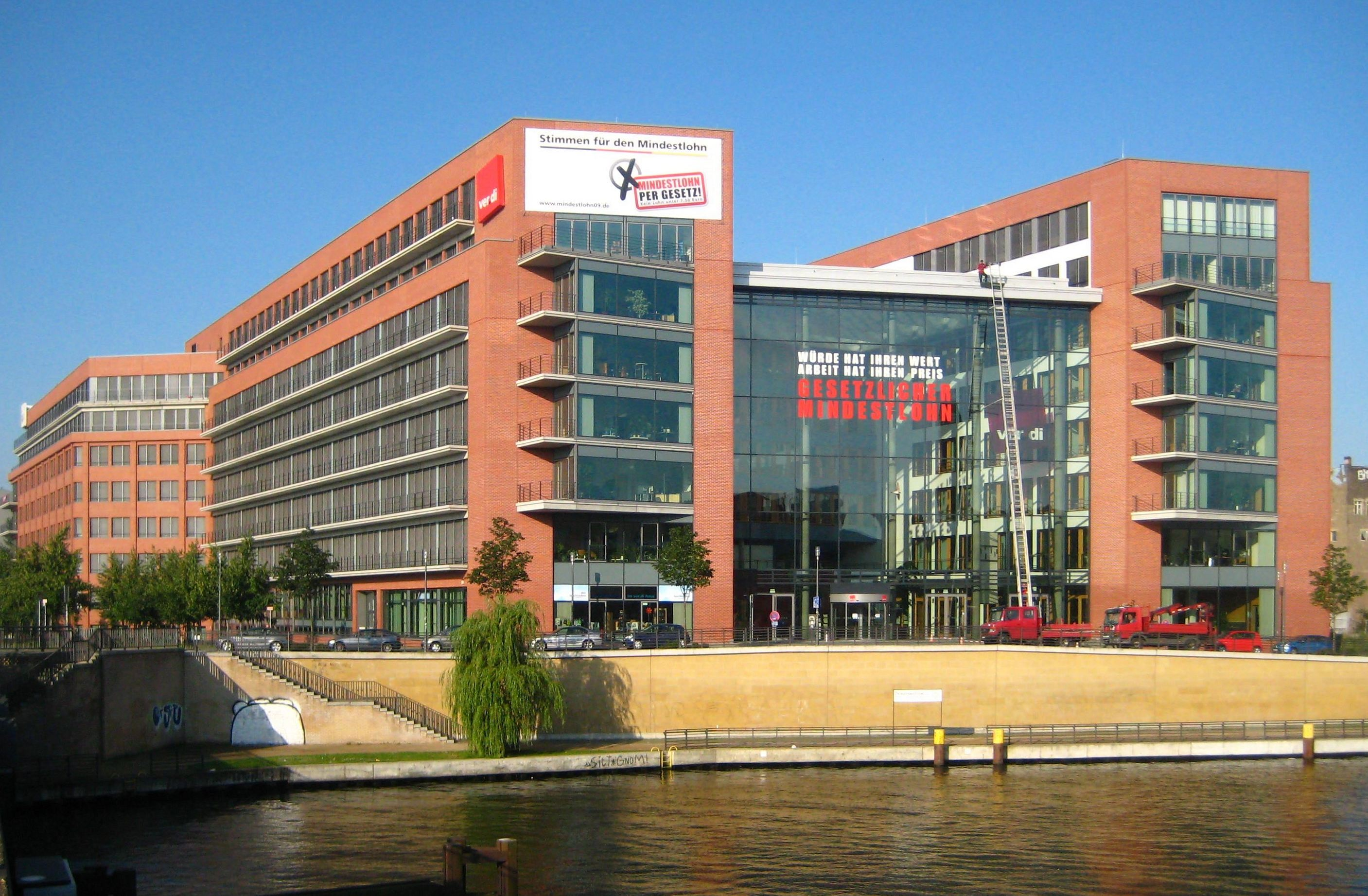
Verdi headquarters in Berlin-Mitte

Vereinte Dienstleistungsgewerkschaft (Verdi (stylized as ver.di; [ˈvɛʁdiː]); English: United Services Trade Union) is a German trade union based in Berlin, Germany. It was established on 19 March 2001 as the result of a merger of five individual unions and is a member of the German Trade Union Confederation (DGB). With around 1.9 million members, Verdi is the second largest German trade union after IG Metall. It currently employs around 3000 members of staff in Germany and has an annual income of approximately 454 million Euros obtained from membership subscriptions. The trade union is divided into 10 federal state districts and five divisions and is managed by a National Executive Board (Bundesvorstand) with nine members. Frank Bsirske was the chairman of Verdi from its founding in 2001 until September 2019, when Frank Werneke was elected.

The Communications Workers of America (CWA) is the largest communications and media labor union in the United States, representing about 700,000 members in both the private and public sectors (also in Canada and Puerto Rico). The union has 27 locals in Canada via CWA-SCA Canada (French: Syndicat des communications d'Amérique) representing about 8,000 members. CWA has several affiliated subsidiary labor unions bringing total membership to over 700,000. CWA is headquartered in Washington, DC, and affiliated with the AFL-CIO, the Strategic Organizing Center, the Canadian Labour Congress, and UNI Global Union.

== TU Workplace Partnerships ==
To bring together T-Mobile workers in Germany (Deutsche Telekom) and the United States (T-Mobile US), TU has created a workplace partnership program that connects German and American workplaces. These partnerships build solidarity and allow workers to join together to make positive change in the workplace and respond to bad behavior by management. So far, there are 6 partnerships between German and American call center representatives, retail associates and technicians.
