= Ultra Mobile =

American MVNO provider

- Type: Private
- Industry: Telecommunications
- Founded: 2011; 15 years ago
- Founder: David Glickman
- Headquarters: Costa Mesa, California, U.S.
- Key people: David Glickman (CEO); Rizwan Kassim (Managing Partner)
- Services: Prepaid mobile phone plans
- Number of employees: 150 (2017)
- Parent: T-Mobile US
- Website: www.ultramobile.com

Ultra Mobile is an American mobile virtual network operator (MVNO) that provides prepaid wireless service on the T-Mobile network. The company is known for plans that include international calling. It is owned by T-Mobile US, which acquired its parent company, Ka'ena Corporation, in 2024.

== History ==
Ultra Mobile was co-founded by CEO David Glickman, who had previously founded TelePacific Communications, Justice Technology, and Primo Connect.

By 2016, Ultra Mobile products were available in over 25,000 retail stores in the US, including Target and 7-Eleven.

In January 2016, the company acquired rights from Univision Communications to manage the Univision Mobile brand, another T-Mobile mobile virtual network operator which specializes in US SIM-based international calling plans for calls to Latin American countries. In May 2017, Ultra Mobile announced that it was closing down the Univision Mobile brand and that it would automatically transfer all Univision Mobile subscribers to Ultra Mobile.

In August 2016, Ultra Mobile launched Mint Mobile, formerly Mint SIM, an online-only MVNO specializing in prepaid mobile plans on the T-Mobile cellular network, which provides discounted pricing based on monthly, quarterly, or yearly terms paid in advance.

In 2017, the company had approximately 150 employees in the US, Europe, and Asia, and had focused on hiring millennials.

In November 2019, the corporate spin-off of Mint Mobile from Ultra Mobile was completed and Ryan Reynolds acquired a 20%-25% ownership stake in Mint Mobile. Reynolds and founder Glickman both served on the board of directors for The Michael J. Fox Foundation and Glickman was impressed with how Reynolds handled marketing for Deadpool.

In March 2023, T-Mobile US agreed to acquire Mint Mobile and Ultra Mobile for up to $1.35 billion. On May 1, 2024, the announcement was published that the planned acquisition was completed as per the agreement.

In July 2025, Ultra Mobile changed its logo from a SIM-card design to a globe design as part of a brand refresh.

In May 2026, Ultra Mobile introduced international roaming passes for short-term travel, covering data, calls and texts outside the United States.

== Products and Services ==
Ultra Mobile sells prepaid plans that run on the T-Mobile 5G network. Plans are available in 1, 3, 6 and 12-month terms, with longer terms priced lower per month. All plans include international calling and texting to 90 countries.

In 2026, BestPhonePlans named Ultra Mobile its Top Pick for International Calling.

== Awards and recognition ==
In 2015, Ultra Mobile was ranked number 1 in Inc. magazine's list of the 5,000 fastest growing private companies in the United States, with a year-over-year growth rate of 100,849% and revenues of US$118 million in 2014, up from less than a million in 2012.

WhistleOut rated Ultra Mobile 3.0 to 3.5 out of 5 stars in 2023, and 4.0 to 4.5 overall in 2026.
