= Flyhomes =

Real estate technology company

Flyhomes is a real estate and financial technology company based in Bellevue, Washington. It began as an online real estate brokerage and later developed financing products designed to help homebuyers make cash offers and purchase a new home before selling an existing one. The company later shifted away from direct-to-consumer brokerage and mortgage operations to a wholesale lending model in which its financing products are distributed through third-party mortgage professionals and real estate agents.

== History ==
Flyhomes launched publicly in 2016. Founded by former Microsoft employees Stephen Lane and Tushar Garg, the company initially operated as an online real estate brokerage that used airline-mile rewards and a technology platform to differentiate its homebuying service.

In 2017, Flyhomes introduced a guarantee designed to make financed home-purchase offers more competitive with cash offers. Under the model described by Forbes, qualifying buyers could make an offer backed by Flyhomes' commitment to purchase the property if the buyer was unable to complete the transaction. Forbes examined the economics and risks of the model, including the possibility that Flyhomes could be left owning a property if a buyer failed to close.

Flyhomes later expanded its cash-offer model. In 2021, The Wall Street Journal reported on California buyers who used Flyhomes to compete in a multiple-offer housing market. Flyhomes purchased the property on the buyers' behalf and subsequently sold it to them at the same price after their mortgage closed. The Journal placed Flyhomes within a broader group of companies using cash-offer programs to make financed buyers more competitive.

Business Insider separately profiled homebuyers who used Flyhomes in 2021 after losing several previous bids. The publication examined Flyhomes' cash-offer service in the context of the pandemic-era housing market, when rising prices, investor activity and competition from cash buyers made financed offers less competitive in some markets.

In 2022, Realtor.com examined Flyhomes' Buy Before You Sell program through the experience of a California homeowner who used a Flyhomes bridge loan to purchase another home before selling his existing property. The article compared Flyhomes with other cash-offer providers and discussed potential costs and risks associated with these programs, including concerns raised by consumer advocates about the role and incentives of third-party intermediaries.

Beginning in 2022, higher mortgage rates and a contraction in venture funding put pressure on Flyhomes' direct-to-consumer business model. The company reduced staff and restructured as housing-market activity slowed. In early 2024, Flyhomes closed its direct mortgage operation and launched a wholesale lending channel that allowed third-party mortgage brokers and lenders to offer Flyhomes products while remaining the borrowers' primary mortgage professionals.

In 2025, Flyhomes exited the real estate brokerage business as it continued its shift toward wholesale distribution. Its in-house real estate agents transitioned to The Real Brokerage, while Flyhomes concentrated on distributing its financing products through outside loan officers and real estate agents.

== Business model ==
Flyhomes does business in buy before you sell and related financing products distributed through mortgage lenders, loan officers and real estate agents. The products are designed for homeowners seeking to purchase another property before completing the sale of their existing home.

Depending on the product, borrowers may use existing home equity or short-term bridge financing toward the purchase of the new property. The company's shift to third-party distribution followed its earlier model in which Flyhomes directly operated real estate brokerage and mortgage businesses.
