= Mint Mobile =

American telecommunications company

Mint Mobile, LLC
- Type: Subsidiary
- Industry: Telecommunications
- Founded: August 7, 2015; 11 years ago
- Founder: David Glickman
- Headquarters: Costa Mesa, California, U.S.
- Key people: David Glickman (CEO); Rizwan Kassim (Managing Partner); Ryan Reynolds (former shareholder and current marketing consultant/spokesperson)
- Services: Mobile virtual network operator
- Revenue: Over $100 million
- Parent: T-Mobile US
- Website: www.mintmobile.com

Mint Mobile, LLC is a mobile virtual network operator owned by T-Mobile US that offers prepaid mobile phone plans.

== History ==
The company was founded in 2015 as Mint SIM, a subsidiary of Ultra Mobile, by David Glickman and Rizwan Kassim.

In November 2019, the corporate spin-off of Mint Mobile from Ultra Mobile was completed and Ryan Reynolds acquired 25% ownership in the company. Reynolds and founder Glickman had both served on the board of directors for The Michael J. Fox Foundation, and Glickman was impressed with Reynolds' marketing for Deadpool.

In May 2024, T-Mobile US acquired Mint Mobile for $1.3 billion in cash and stock. Reynolds received $300 million for his interest and remains in a creative role with the company.

=== Advertising campaigns ===
For Super Bowl LIII in 2019, Mint Mobile aired an ad featuring a fictional advertisement for "chunky style milk", showing a family happily drinking spoiled milk, with the company's anthropomorphic fox mascot comparing it to paying too much for wireless. The ad was controversial due to the gross nature of its subject material. Eric Nathan of Barstool Sports commented "Show me people drinking chunky milk and I'll show you me not buying your product ever."

The next year for Super Bowl LIV, Ryan Reynolds and Mint bought newspaper ads rather than ads for the game, which offered new subscribers 3 free months of service during the big game. Part of the ad read “On Sunday, some companies will spend over $5 million to advertise in a game so expensive I can’t even mention its name lest we summon an army of lawyers".

In September 2020, the company launched an advertisement featuring the great-great-great-great granddaughter of Paul Revere.

In January 2022, the company launched the "Winnie-the-Screwed" advertising campaign, the first major parody of Winnie-the-Pooh after it entered the public domain.

== See also ==
- List of mobile virtual network operators in the United States
