= John Legere =

American businessman and former CEO of T-Mobile US

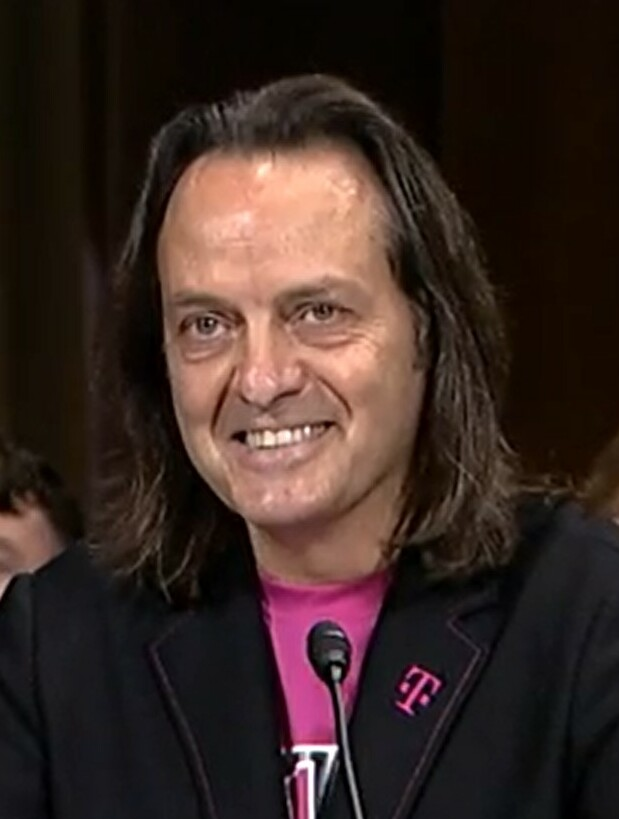
- Legere in 2018
- Born: John Joseph Legere; June 4, 1958 (age 68)
- Education: UMass Amherst (BBA); Massachusetts Institute of Technology (MS); Fairleigh Dickinson University (MBA)
- Occupation: Businessman
- Title: former CEO T-Mobile US
- Term: September 2012 – April 2020
- Successor: Mike Sievert
- Board member of: T-Mobile US
- Children: 2

John Legere (born June 4, 1958) is an American businessman, former chief executive officer (CEO) and president of T-Mobile US. He previously worked for AT&T, Dell, and Global Crossing. He resigned as CEO following the approval of the merger of T-Mobile and Sprint.

== Early life and education ==
A Massachusetts native, Legere graduated from St. Bernard's Central Catholic School in Fitchburg, Massachusetts and aspired to be a gym teacher, before he figured out he wanted a more lucrative career and decided to study business instead. He received an Accounting BBA from the Isenberg School of Management at the University of Massachusetts Amherst, an MS, as an Alfred P. Sloan fellow, at the MIT Sloan School of Management and an MBA from Fairleigh Dickinson University. He also completed Harvard Business School's Program for Management Development (PMD).

== Career ==
Legere was appointed CEO of T-Mobile US in September 2012, and has since been noted for T-Mobile's "Un-carrier" approach to contract-free wireless networks.

He first worked in telecommunications at New England Telephone in 1980. Legere then spent nearly twenty years at AT&T, where he spent some time working under Daniel Hesse, formerly CEO of Sprint Corporation. He was chief executive for AT&T Asia from April 1994 to November 1997, and also spent time as head of AT&T Global Strategy and Business Development. From 1997 to 1998, he was president of the worldwide outsourcing subsidiary of AT&T, AT&T Solutions.

Legere then worked as senior vice president of Dell and president and chief operations officer for Dell's Operations in Europe, the Middle East and Africa and president, Asia-Pacific for Dell from 1998 to February 2000. Prior to joining T-Mobile US, he was CEO of Asia Global Crossing from February 2000 to January 2002, and CEO of Global Crossing from October 2001 to October 2011 where he led the organization through bankruptcy and eventually an acquisition by Level 3 Communications. His leadership at Global Crossing was controversial, which included large executive bonuses and filing for bankruptcy.

He is on the CTIA board of directors, and has been a director of the CTIA wireless internet caucus, since October 2012. He was a director of Global Crossing, from October 2001 to December 2003, and Sanrise Group and Asia Global Crossing, from April 2000 to March 2002. He was a director of ON Semiconductor. He is a member of the board of New York Road Runners.

Legere succeeded Jim Alling, and became CEO of T-Mobile USA, September 2012. In November 2019, Legere announced via his Twitter account he would be stepping down as the CEO for T-Mobile US on April 30, 2020, when his current contract expires. Mike Sievert, who was chief operating officer at the time, was announced as Legere’s replacement. The change was originally planned to become effective on May 1, 2020. Following the merger with Sprint being completed early, Legere officially resigned as CEO on April 1, 2020.

He joined the board of Paradise Mobile as a strategic advisor in December 2024.

== Personal life ==
Legere was a nationally competitive runner in college and post-college and still competes in events with fellow employees. In 2004, he completed the Boston Marathon as a member of the Dana–Farber Cancer Institute Marathon Challenge team. In May 2016 in support of competitive running, he purchased ad space on Nick Symmonds' shoulder for T-Mobile.

He has been a member of the corporate advisory board of the School of Business and Management, Hong Kong University of Science and Technology, and the government relations committee of the American Chamber of Commerce, Hong Kong. 1 adopted daughter.

Legere has been divorced twice and has two daughters.

Since 2016, he has pitched his ideas and asked people to sign up for T-Mobile service with a cooking show on Facebook Live, called "Slow Cooker Sunday" which, as its name suggests, runs every Sunday. In 2018, he wrote a cookbook featuring recipes he used in slow cooker Sunday broadcasts titled "#SlowCookerSunday – Leadership, Life and Slow Cooking with CEO and Chef, John Legere". The book includes a foreword from Martha Stewart, a friend of Legere's. The proceeds of the book go to the charity Feeding America.
