= Antoni Leśniowski =

Polish surgeon (1867–1940)

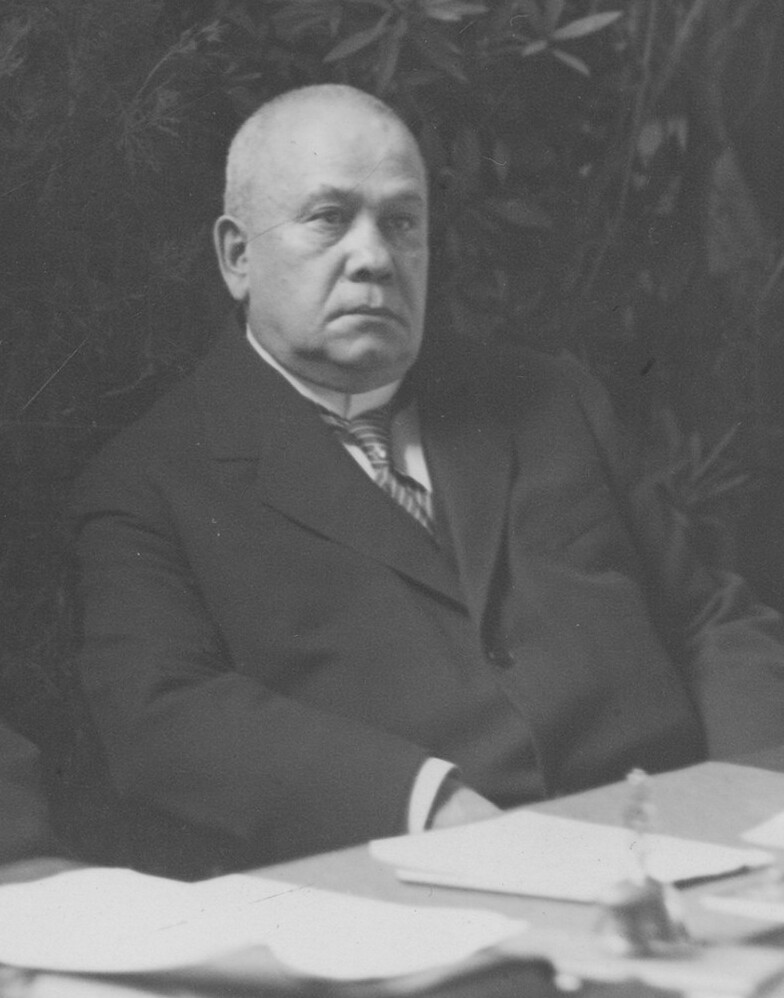
Antoni Leśniowski in 1931

Antoni Leśniowski (January 28, 1867 – April 4, 1940) was a Polish surgeon, credited with publishing what may have been the earliest reports of the condition which later became known as Crohn's disease.

He graduated in medicine from the University of Warsaw in 1890, and studied further in Berlin. From 1892 to 1912 he worked as a surgeon at the Infant Jesus Hospital in Warsaw, specialising in urology. Despite this, his most notable reports were on several cases of inflammatory bowel disease. On May 10, 1903, Medycyna, a weekly medical newspaper, published an article in which he described several cases of intestinal disease, concluding in at least one case: "we suspected a chronic inflammatory process in the wall of the gut." He wrote three further articles describing cases for the Pamiętnik Towarzystwa Lekarskiego Warszawskiego (Annals of the Warsaw Medical Association) between 1903 and 1905, consistent with what is now known as Crohn's disease, although the evidence is not conclusive. In one of these articles, in 1904, he reported a meeting of the Warsaw Medical Society, at which he presented a surgical specimen of an inflammatory tumour of the terminal ileum with a fistula to the ascending colon.

The disease was described again in 1932 by US American gastroenterologists Burrill Bernard Crohn, Leon Ginzburg and Gordon D. Oppenheimer, and since that time, due to the precedence of the name Crohn in the alphabet, it has been known in the worldwide literature as Crohn’s disease. Only in Poland it is known as Leśniowski-Crohn’s disease.

During 1912–1914, he was the director of Warsaw’s St Anthony Hospital, then until 1919, was the head of surgery department in the Holy Spirit Hospital in Warsaw. During 1919–1936, he was a professor of surgery at the University of Warsaw. He also wrote a textbook on general surgery.
