= Orofacial granulomatosis =

- Other names: granulomatous cheilitis, cheilitis granulomatosa, cheilitis granulomatosis, oral granulomatosis
- Specialty: Gastroenterology

Orofacial granulomatosis (OFG) is a condition characterized by persistent enlargement of the soft tissues of the mouth, lips and the area around the mouth on the face. The enlargement does not cause any pain, but the best treatment and the prognosis are uncertain. The mechanism of the enlargement is granulomatous inflammation. The underlying cause of the condition is not completely understood, and there is disagreement as to how it relates to Crohn disease and sarcoidosis.

== Signs and symptoms ==
Signs and symptoms may include:

- Persistent or recurrent enlargement of the lips, causing them to protrude. If recurrent, the interval during which the lips are enlarged may be weeks or months. The enlargement can cause midline fissuring of the lip ("median cheilitis") or angular cheilitis (sores at the corner of the mouth). The swelling is non-pitting (cf. pitting edema) and feels soft or rubbery on palpation. The mucous membrane of the lip may be erythematous (red) and granular. One or both lips may be affected.
- Oral ulceration (mouth ulcers) which may be aphthous like, or be more chronic and deep with raised margins. Alternatively, lesions similar to pyostomatitis vegetans may occur in OFG, but this is uncommon.
- "Full width" gingivitis (compare with marginal gingivitis).
- Gingival enlargement (swelling of the gums).
- Fissured tongue (grooves in the tongue).
- Enlargement of the mucous membrane of the mouth, which may be associated with cobblestoning and mucosal tags (similar lesions often occur on the intestinal mucosa in Crohn disease).
- Enlargement of the perioral and periorbital soft tissues (the tissues of the face around the mouth and the eyes). The facial skin may be dry, exfoliative (flaking) or erythematous.
- Cervical lymphadenopathy (enlarged lymph nodes in the neck).
- Facial palsy (weakness and altered sensation of the face).

The enlargement of the tissues of the mouth, lips and face seen in OFG is painless. Melkersson–Rosenthal syndrome is where OFG occurs with fissured tongue and paralysis of the facial nerve. The cause of the facial paralysis is thought to be caused by the formation of granulomas in the facial nerve, which supplies the muscles of facial expression.

== Causes ==
The cause of the condition is unknown. The disease is characterized by non-caseating granulomatous inflammation. That is, the granulomas do not undergo the caseating ("cheese-like") necrosis typical of the granulomas of tuberculosis.

There is disagreement as to whether OFG represents an early form of Crohn disease or sarcoidosis, or whether it is a distinct, but similar clinical entity. Crohn disease can affect any part of gastrointestinal tract, from mouth to anus. When it involves the mouth alone, some authors refer to this as "oral Crohn disease", distinguishing it from OFG, and others suggest that OFG is the same condition as Crohn disease when it presents in the oral cavity.

OFG may represent a delayed hypersensitivity reaction, but the causative antigen(s) is not identified or varies form one individual to the next. Suspected sources of antigens include metals, e.g. cobalt, or additives and preservatives in foods, including benzoates, benzoic acid, cinnamaldehyde, metabisulfates, butylated hydroxyanisole, dodecyl gallate, tartrazine, or menthol, Examples of foods which may contain these substances include margarine, cinnamon, eggs, chocolate or peppermint oil.

Some suggest that infection with atypical mycobacteria could be involved, (paratuberculosis), and that OFG is a reaction to mycobacterial stress protein mSP65 acting as an antigen.

In response to an antigen, a chronic, submucosal, T cell mediated inflammatory response occurs, which involves cytokines (e.g. tumor necrosis factor alpha), protease-activated receptors, matrix metalloproteinases and cyclooxygenases. The granulomas in OFG form in the lamina propria, and may form adjacent to or within lymphatic vessels. This is thought to cause obstruction of lymphatic drainage and lymphedema which is manifest as swelling clinically.

There may be a genetic predisposition to the condition. People who develop OFG often have a history of atopy, such as childhood asthma or eczema.

== Diagnosis ==
The diagnosis is usually made by tissue biopsy; however, this cannot reliably distinguish between the granulomas of OFG and those of Crohn disease or sarcoidosis. Other causes of granulomatous inflammation are ruled out, such as sarcoidosis, Crohn disease, allergic or foreign body reactions and mycobacterial infections.

=== Classification ===
OFG could be classified as a type of cheilitis (lip inflammation), hence the alternative names for the condition using the word cheilitis, and a granulomatous condition.

== Treatment ==
Anti-tumour necrosis factor α drugs (e.g. infliximab) are used to treat OFG.

Dietary restriction of a particular suspected or proven antigen may be involved in the management of OFG, such as cinnamon or benzoate-free diets.

== Epidemiology ==
OFG is uncommon, but the incidence is increasing. The disease usually presents in adolescence or young adulthood. It may occur in either sex, but males are slightly more commonly affected.

== History ==
OFG was first described in 1985.
