= Vesicopustular dermatosis =

- Specialty: Dermatology

Vesicopustular dermatosis is a cutaneous condition characterized by neutrophils, and associated with bowel disorders.

== See also ==
- Pyostomatitis vegetans
- List of cutaneous conditions
