= Thomas Kennedy Dalziel =

Scottish surgeon and pathologist

Professor Sir T. Kennedy Dalziel
- Portrait image of T Kennedy Dalziel
- Born: October 1861; Penpont
- Died: 10 February 1924 (aged 62); Glasgow
- Education: University of Edinburgh Medical School
- Known for: First medical description of Crohn's disease
- Scientific career
- Fields: surgery, pathology
- Workplaces: Glasgow Royal Infirmary, Western Infirmary, Anderson's College

Thomas Kennedy Dalziel, known as T Kennedy Dalziel FFPS (October 1861 – 10 February 1924), was a Scottish surgeon and pathologist who specialised particularly in abdominal surgery. Dalziel was most notable for being considered the best technical surgeon at the time in western Scotland. He was also particularly notable for the discovery of a disease called chronic interstitial enteritis in 1913, that later became known as Crohn's disease.

== Life ==
Dalziel took his early schooling in Dumfries before matriculating at the University of Edinburgh Medical School and subsequently graduated in 1883 with a Bachelor of Medicine, Bachelor of Surgery. After visiting Berlin to gain experience in experimental surgery and Vienna for pathology, Dalziel returned to Glasgow to start his post clinical training with a post as a house surgeon at the Glasgow Royal Infirmary with the noted neurologist William Macewen

== Career ==
In 1885, Dalziel succeeded Sir William Macewen as casualty surgeon at the Glasgow Royal Infirmary, and held the position until 1894. In 1889 he was appointed to the surgical staff of the Western Infirmary as an assistant to Sir Hector Clare Cameron in ward rounds and teaching. In 1891, he was appointed Professor of Medical Jurisprudence at Anderson's College. In 1893 he appointed Dean at Andersons, and in 1895, he promoted to Professor of Surgery. He remained in that post at Anderson until 1902, when he was promoted to Visiting Surgeon at the Western Infirmary.

Dalziel was also associated with the Royal Hospital for Sick Children for many years, and where he took an active part in the planning and erection of the new hospital. He was appointed in 1888 as an extra honorary surgeon at the Dispensary. In 1892, when Hector Clare Cameron resigned his post, Dalziel was appointed as Visiting Surgeon to the Royal Hospital for Sick Children.

In 1913, Dalziel gave the Dr James Watson lecture for the Faculty of Physicians and Surgeons, with a title of Some practical points in abdominal surgery.

For much of his life, Dalziel volunteered, initially in his home county of Dumfriesshire but later in a military capacity working at the Royal Engineers in the Clyde submarine division. When the Territorial Medical Service was established in 1908, Dalziel joined immediately, he was posted to the 3rd General Hospital located at Stobhill Hospital in Glasgow as director with the rank of Major à la suite. When the first world war broke out, Dalziel and his unit were mobilised to the Royal Army Medical Corps and was promoted to the rank of Lieutenant-colonel. In 1916 the War Office ordered him to visit various hospitals in France.

== Crohn's disease ==
In 1913 Crohn's disease was first discovered by Dalziel while he was a surgeon at the Western Infirmary, and that he described in his classic paper, Chronic Interstitial Enteritis. In his paper Dalziel described nine patients in which he observed eosinophils, giant cells and granulomas with no infectious agents. The first patient was a professional colleague and upon operating Dalziel found that the whole intestine was chronically inflamed and was unable to restore function with the patient dying. The second patient was seen several years later in Paisley and was more acute and this patient also died. The third patient was called Mrs T by Dalziel and was seen in 1905. Dalzeil operated along with Samson Gemmell and removed two feet of the jejunum that was found to be infected. In a child of 10 he found a great thickening of the bowel wall and in a description of the pathology described it as having the consistence and smoothness of an eel in a state of rigor mortis. Of the nine patients two died of the disease, the other seven were treated to surgery. Dalziel described common symptoms in all the cases, that were characteristic feature being violent colic that caused vomiting and occasionally an escape of some blood, also constant mucus from the bowel. In the examination of the disease, Dalziel drew particular attention to the bowel, something that Burrill Bernard Crohn, the American gastroenterologist who discovered the disease, did not. Dalziel gave it the name hyperplastic enteritis.

== Membership ==
Dalziel was a member of the Royal Medical Society and the Pathological and Clinical Society of Glasgow located at Faculty Hall, 242 St Vincent's Street, Glasgow. In 1887 Dalziel was elected as a Fellow of the Faculty of Physicians and Surgeons that was later known as the Royal College of Physicians and Surgeons of Glasgow. In 1912 he was elected a member of the Harveian Society of Edinburgh and served as President in 1923.

== Awards and honours ==
For his services during World War I to the Advisory Council of the Royal Army Medical Corps, Dalziel was knighted by King George V.
