= Geographic tongue =

Tongue disorder

- Other names: Benign migratory glossitis, Glossitis areata exfoliativa, Erythema migrans of tongue
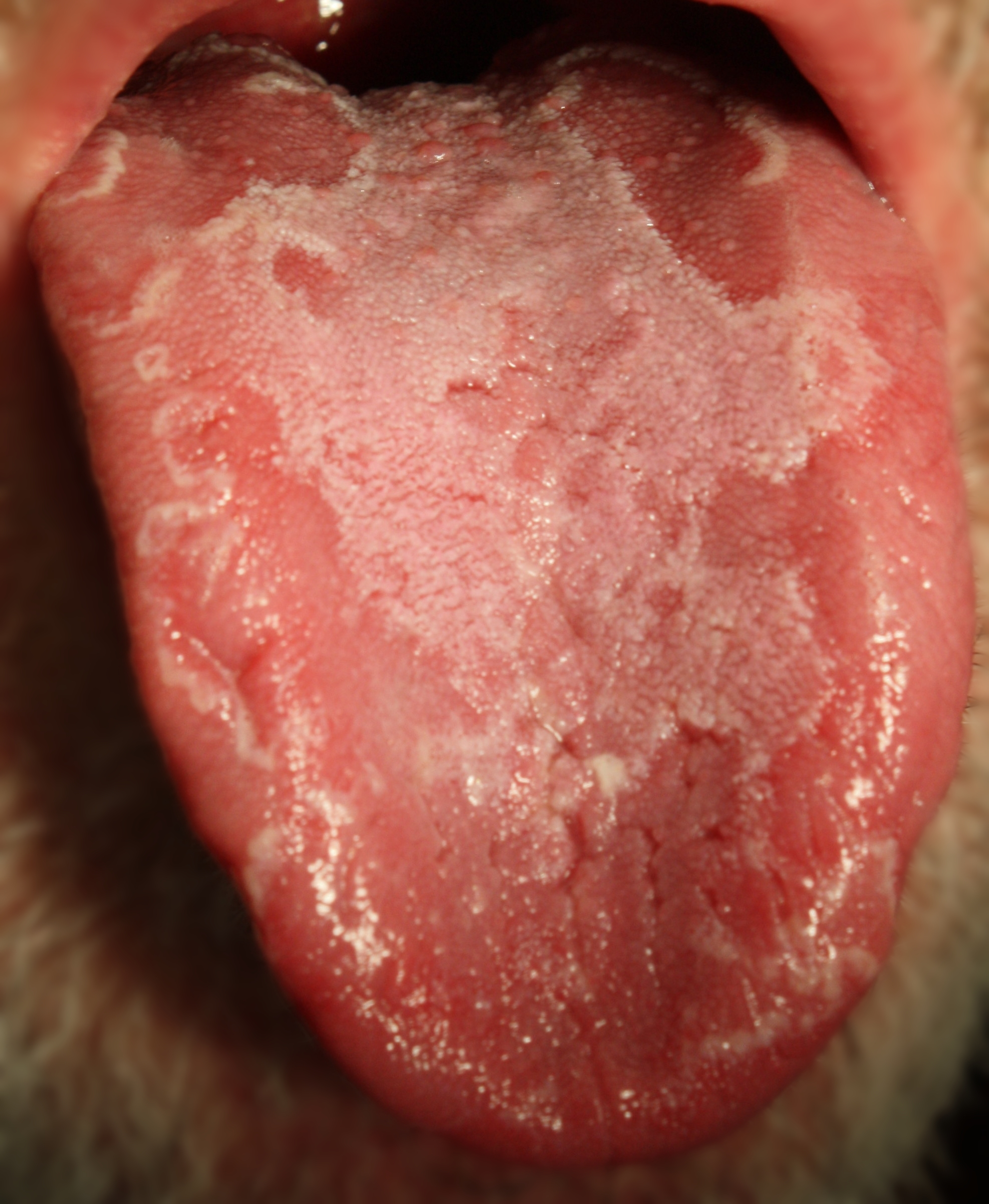
- A patient with geographic tongue
- Specialty: Oral Medicine, Oral and Maxillofacial Surgery, Dermatology
- Symptoms: Burning sensation (rare)
- Causes: Unknown
- Diagnostic method: Visual examination
- Differential diagnosis: Oral lichen planus, erythematous candidiasis, leukoplakia, glossitis, and chemical burns
- Prevention: None
- Treatment: Reassurance, time
- Medication: None
- Frequency: 2-3%
- Deaths: None

Geographic tongue, also known by several other terms, (Note: Also known as benign migratory glossitis, erythema migrans, erythema migrans lingualis, glossitis areata exfoliativa, glossitis areata migrans, lingua geographica, psoriasiform mucositis, stomatitis areata migrans, wandering rash of the tongue, and transitory benign plaques of the tongue.) is a condition of the mucous membrane of the tongue, usually on the dorsal surface. It is a condition affecting approximately 2–3% of the general population. It is characterized by areas of smooth, red depapillation (loss of lingual papillae) that migrate over time. The name comes from the map-like appearance of the tongue, with the patches resembling the islands of an archipelago. The cause is unknown, but the condition is entirely benign (importantly, it does not represent oral cancer), and there is no curative treatment. Uncommonly, geographic tongue may cause a burning sensation on the tongue, for which various treatments have been described with little formal evidence of efficacy.

== Signs and symptoms ==
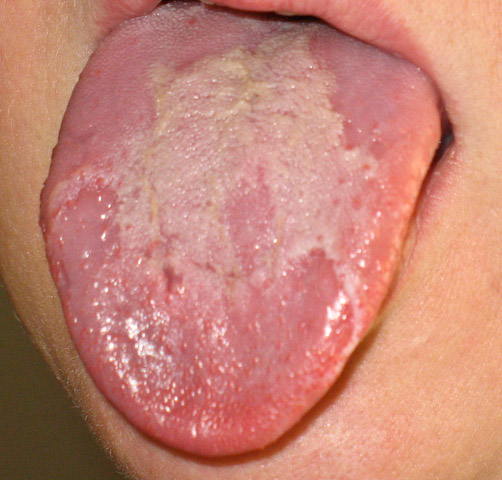
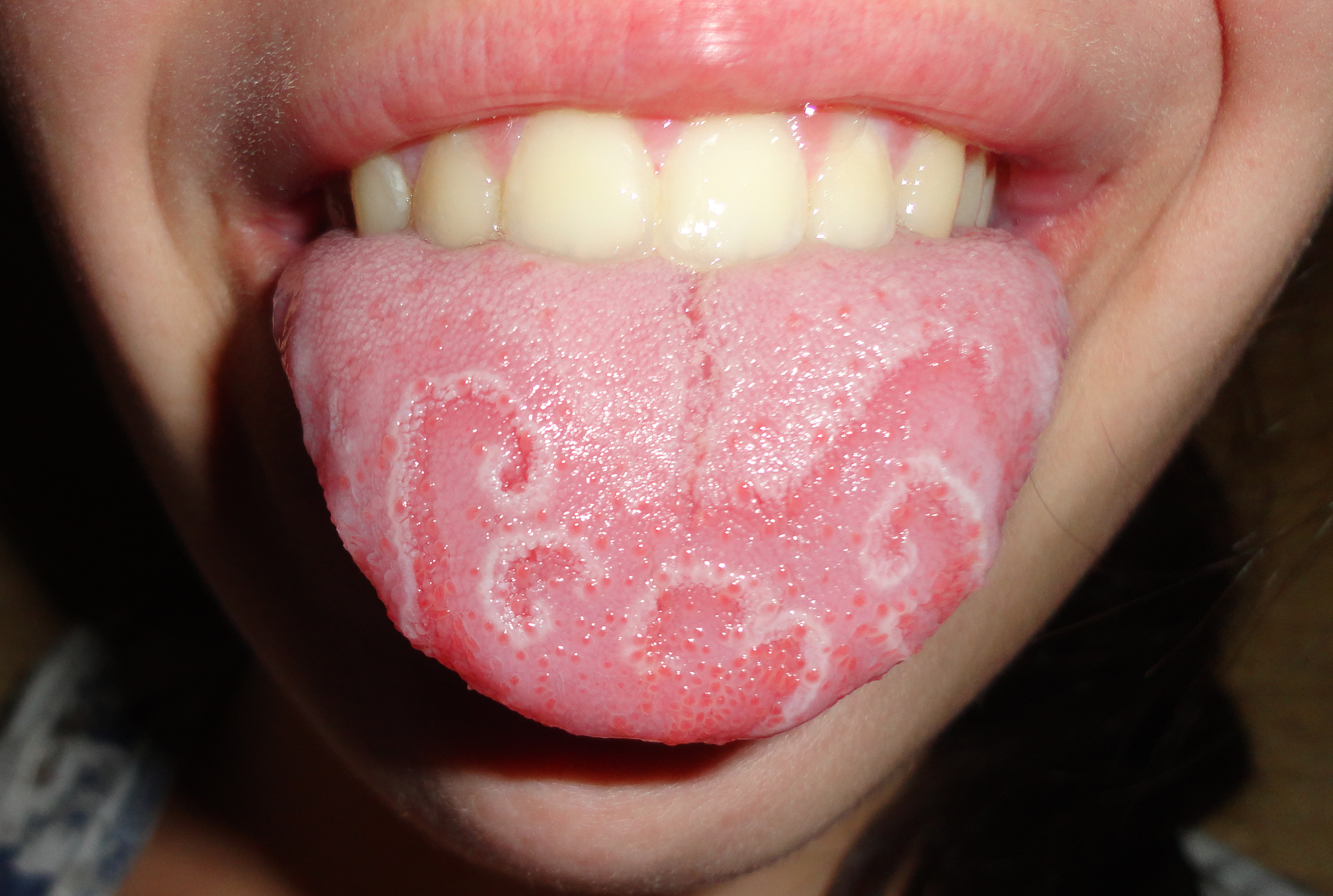
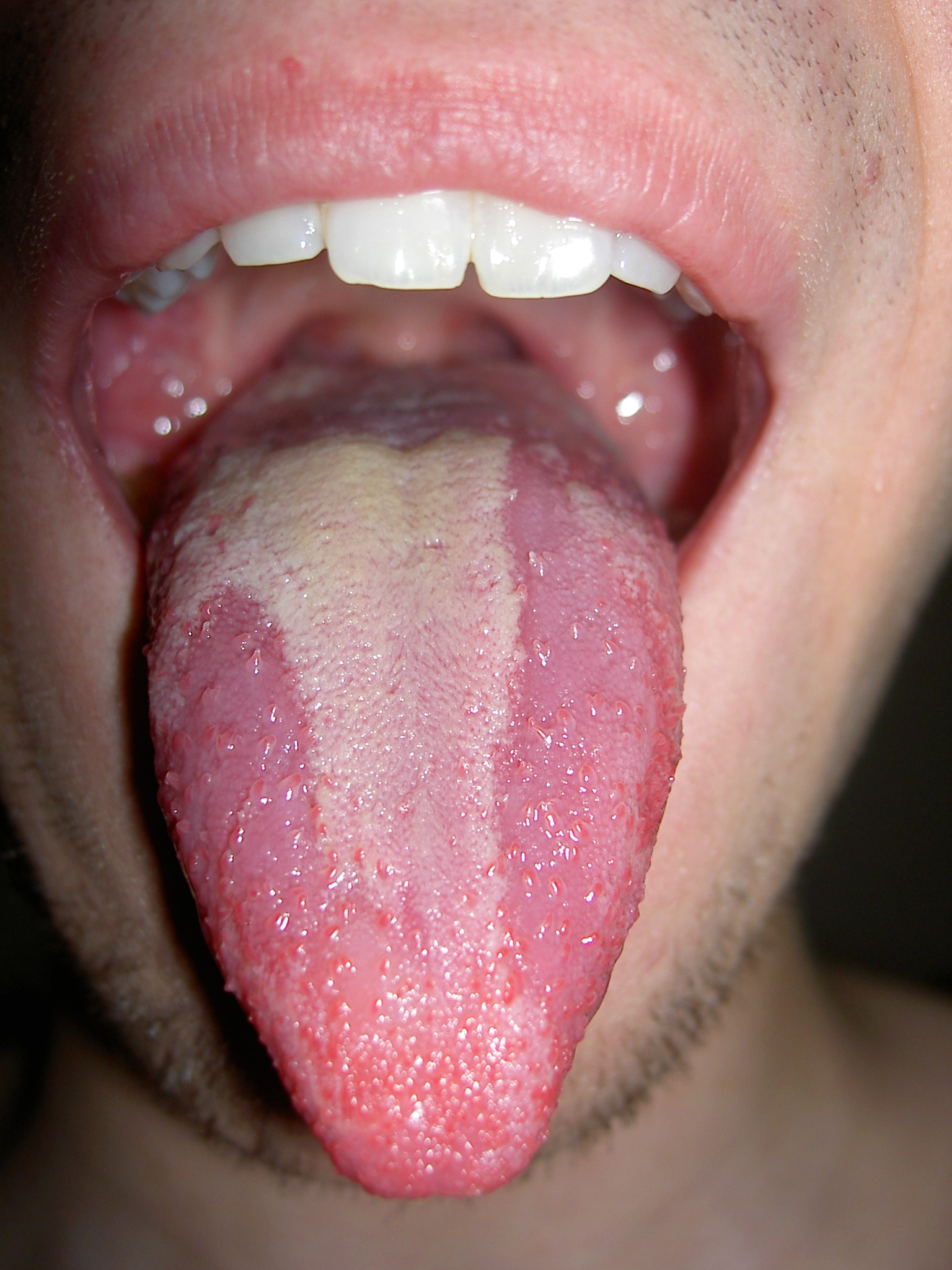
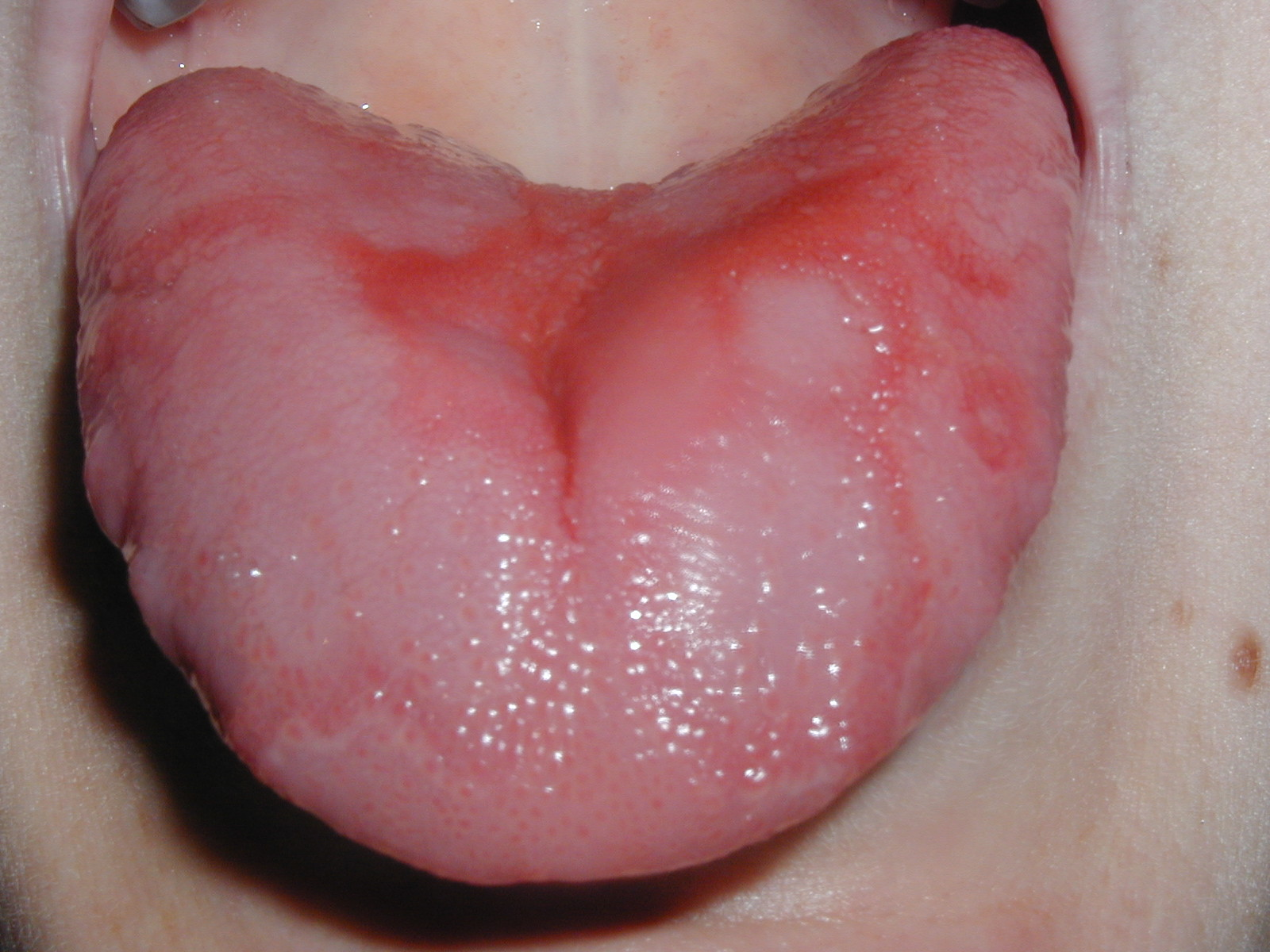

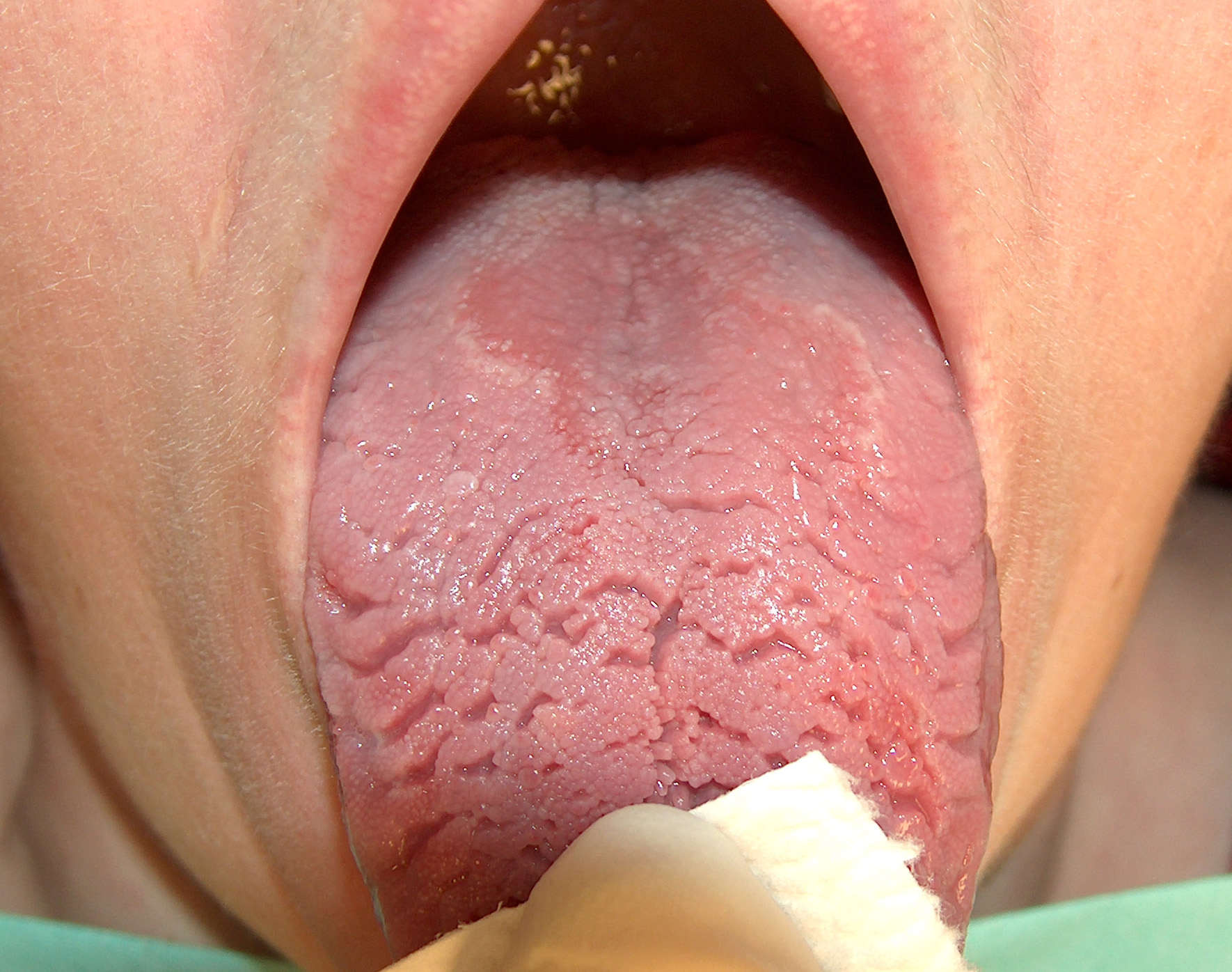
The appearance of geographic tongue is variable from one person to the next and changes over time. The bottom image shows fissured tongue combined with geographic tongue. It is common for these two conditions to coexist.

In health, the dorsal surface of the tongue is covered in tuft-like projections called lingual papillae (some of which are associated with taste buds), which give the tongue an irregular surface texture and a white-pink color. Areas of atrophy and depapillation (loss of papillae) characterize Geographic tongue, leaving an erythematous (darker red) and smoother surface than the unaffected areas. The depapillated areas are usually well-demarcated, and bordered by a slightly raised, white, yellow, or grey, serpiginous (snaking) peripheral zone. A lesion of geographic tongue may start as a white patch before the depapillation occurs. In certain cases, there may be only one lesion, but this is uncommon; the lesions will typically occur in multiple locations on the tongue and coalesce over time to form the typical map-like appearance. The lesions usually change in shape and size, and migrate to other areas, sometimes within hours. The condition may affect only part of the tongue, with a predilection for the tip and the sides of the tongue, or the entire dorsal surface at any one time. The condition goes through periods of remission and relapse. Loss of the white peripheral zone is thought to signify periods of mucosal healing.

There are usually no symptoms other than the unusual appearance of the tongue, but in some cases, affected people may experience pain or burning when eating hot, acidic, spicy, or other foods (e.g., cheese, tomatoes, fruit). Where there is a burning symptom, other causes of a burning sensation on the tongue are considered, such as oral candidiasis.

== Causes ==
The cause is unknown. Geographic tongue does not usually cause any symptoms, and in those cases where there are symptoms, an oral parafunctional habit may be a contributory factor. Persons with parafunctional habits related to the tongue may show scalloping on the sides of the tongue (crenated tongue). Some suggest that hormonal factors may be involved, because one reported case in a female appeared to vary in severity in correlation with oral contraceptive use. People with geographic tongue frequently claim that their condition worsens during periods of psychological stress. Geographic tongue is inversely associated with smoking and tobacco use. Sometimes geographic tongue is said to run in families, and it is reported to be associated with several different genes. Studies show family association may also be related to similar diets. Some have reported links with various human leukocyte antigens, such as increased incidence of HLA-DR5, HLA-DRW6 and HLA-Cw6 and decreased incidence in HLA-B51. Vitamin B2 deficiency (ariboflavinosis) can cause several signs in the mouth, possibly including geographic tongue. However, other sources state that geographic tongue is not related to nutritional deficiency. Fissured tongue often occurs simultaneously with geographic tongue, and some consider fissured tongue to be an end stage of geographic tongue.

In the past, some studies suggested that geographic tongue was associated with diabetes, seborrheic dermatitis, and atopy; however, newer research does not corroborate these findings. Others suggest allergy as a major factor, for example, to nickel sulphate.

Geographic tongue and psoriasis co-occur at a rate that is higher than would be predicted by chance. Most people with geographic tongue do not develop psoriasis, and most people with psoriasis do not have geographic tongue. People who have both geographic tongue and psoriasis may have a greater severity of psoriasis and be less responsive to psoriasis treatment.

Lesions that are histologically indistinguishable from geographic tongue may also be diagnosed in reactive arthritis (arthritis, uveitis/conjunctivitis, and urethritis).

== Predisposing factors ==
Geographic tongue (GT) is a lesion with an unknown origin. However, it has been reported more frequently in people with psoriasis, a history of allergies, asthma, and rhinitis. Studies have also suggested that psychological/psychiatric factors, diabetes mellitus, gastrointestinal diseases, and hematological disorders may predispose a person to GT; however, more studies with a larger cohort are needed to determine if GT could be an oral manifestation of a systemic disease.

There is strong evidence to support a high prevalence of celiac disease and iron deficiency anemia in patients with GT. Oral candidiasis and dental cavities are commonly reported in patients with GT; however, this may be explained by saliva with a lower pH, which will promote the cariogenic process.

The most common areas in which GT can be found include the lateral border of the tongue, followed by the anterior dorsum of the tongue and the ventral surface.

== Diagnosis ==
Diagnosis of geographic tongue (GT) mainly relies on clinical intraoral findings. As GT is usually asymptomatic in the mouth, it does not require treatment. A differential diagnosis between oral candidiasis and GT, two similar-looking conditions, can be established through a careful and thorough examination. GT is a keratotic lesion that can be described as a round or irregularly shaped white plaque that cannot be scraped off and is normally self-resolving. These lesions are known to reoccur within variable periods. Although rare, cytological techniques and biopsies can aid in a clinical diagnosis. The cytological description can define the disease due to its inflammatory characteristics, with its main characteristic being nuclear demarcation. Furthermore, it is important to remain aware that GT may be related to other extraoral and intraoral conditions.

The differential diagnosis includes oral lichen planus, erythematous candidiasis, leukoplakia, lupus erythematosus, glossitis, and chemical burns. Atrophic glossitis is usually distinguished from benign migratory glossitis based on the migrating pattern of the lesions and the presence of a whitish border. These features, which are not present in atrophic glossitis, instead show lesions that enlarge rather than migrate. Rarely, blood tests may be required to distinguish from glossitis associated with anemia or other nutritional deficiencies. Since the appearance and the history of the condition (i.e., migrating areas of depapillation) are so striking, there is rarely any need for a biopsy. When a biopsy is taken, the histopathologic appearance is quite similar to psoriasis:

- Hyperparakeratosis.
- Acanthosis.
- Subepithelial T lymphocyte inflammatory infiltrate.
- Migration of neutrophilic granulocytes into the epithelial layer, which may create superficial microabscesses, similar to the Munro's microabscesses described in pustular psoriasis.

=== Classification ===
Geographic tongue could be considered to be a type of glossitis. It usually presents only on the dorsal two-thirds and lateral surfaces of the tongue, but less commonly an identical condition can occur on other mucosal sites in the mouth, such as the ventral surface (undersurface) of the tongue, mucosa of the cheeks or lips, or the soft palate or floor of the mouth, usually in addition to tongue involvement. In such cases, terms such as stomatitis erythema migrans, ectopic geographic tongue, areata migrans, geographic stomatitis, or migratory stomatitis are used instead of geographic tongue. Besides the differences in locations of presentation inside the oral cavity and prevalence among the general population, in all other aspects of clinical significance, symptoms, treatment, and histopathologic appearance, these two forms are identical.

This condition is sometimes termed (oral) erythema migrans, but this has no relation to the more common use of the term erythema migrans (erythema chronicum migrans) to describe the appearance of skin lesions in Lyme disease and southern tick-associated rash illness.

== Treatment ==
Geographic tongue, also termed benign migratory glossitis, usually presents without symptoms. Due to a lack of reliable evidence, researchers can not identify a specific treatment for the condition. It is currently suggested that patients be reassured that the condition is entirely benign and self-resolving.

Although there is no established gold-standard treatment confirmed by current evidence, patients with symptomatic GT can be advised on several treatment options prescribed by the clinician on a case-by-case basis. This includes possible prescriptions of antihistamines, anxiolytics, corticosteroids, and topical anaesthetics. It is recommended that patients avoid spicy and acidic foods. Research has not shown high levels of evidence for the treatment of symptomatic GT, and larger studies are needed to come to a reliable recommendation.

== Prognosis ==
The condition may disappear over time, but it is impossible to predict if or when this may happen.

== Epidemiology ==
Geographic tongue is a common condition, affecting 2-3% of the adult general population. Other sources report a prevalence of up to 14%. It is one of the most common tongue disorders that occur in children. The condition often starts in childhood, sometimes at an early age, but others report that the highest incidence occurs in the over 40 age group. Females are sometimes reported to be more commonly affected than males, in a 2:1 ratio, Others report that the gender distribution is equal.

== Manifestations in COVID-19 infection ==
Many articles, including case reports, case series, and cross-sectional studies, have been done since the 2020 outbreak of COVID-19 caused a global pandemic. These studies have shown that approximately 20% of people with COVID-19 may present with mucosal manifestations in their oral cavities, including geographic tongue. Geographic tongue may appear alongside the onset of the regular symptoms of COVID-19.

Interleukin-6 (IL-6) is an important biomarker in people with COVID-19 in relation to a cytokine storm, a condition in which excessive inflammatory cells adversely affect organ systems throughout the body. Geographic tongue is associated with elevated levels of IL-6, which possibly helps explain the presentation in confirmed COVID-19 cases. This evidence is minimal and requires further study to confirm these claims.
