= Salivary gland hypoplasia =

Medical condition

Salivary gland hypoplasia is relative underdevelopment of the Salivary glands. Salivary gland hypoplasia tends to produce xerostomia (dry mouth), with all the associated problems this brings.

It is a rare condition, which may occur as a congenital abnormality or result from lack of neuromuscular stimulation.

It may be associated with Melkersson–Rosenthal syndrome, and hereditary ectodermal dysplasia.
