= Leon Ginzburg =

American surgeon (1898–1988)

Ginzburg c. 1930s

Leon Ginzburg (April 10, 1898 in New York City – March 19, 1988 in Manhattan) was an American surgeon. He received both his undergraduate and medical degrees from Columbia University.

While an adjunct surgeon at Mt. Sinai Hospital, Ginzburg collaborated with a colleague, Gordon D. Oppenheimer, in writing a paper detailing their research into diseases of the bowel. They shared their research and paper with Burrill B. Crohn, who made some additions and then presented the paper to the American Medical Association in 1932. What was initially known as "terminal ileitis" eventually became known as "Crohn's disease", as Crohn's name was the first to be listed in the paper, published in the Journal of the American Medical Association also in 1932.

Ginzburg served as a professor of surgery for many years at the Mt. Sinai School of Medicine and was director of surgery from 1947 to 1967 at Beth Israel Hospital in Manhattan.
