= Cervical lymphadenopathy =

Disease of the lymph nodes

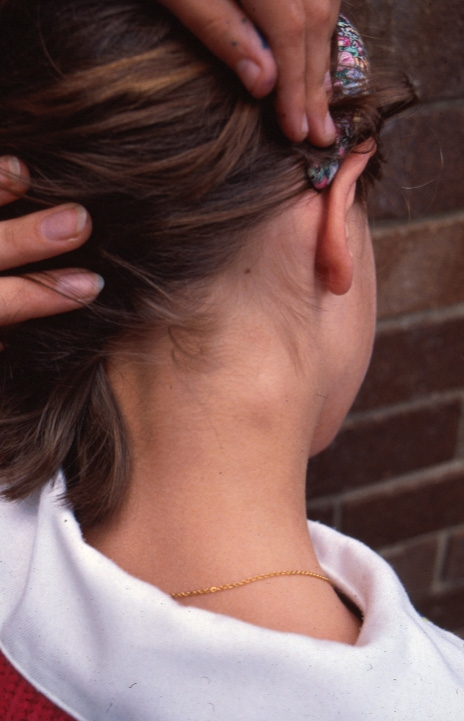
Swollen lymph node in the neck due to tick attached behind ear

Cervical lymphadenopathy refers to lymphadenopathy of the cervical lymph nodes (the glands in the neck). The term lymphadenopathy strictly speaking refers to disease of the lymph nodes, though it is often used to describe the enlargement of the lymph nodes. Similarly, the term lymphadenitis refers to inflammation of a lymph node, but often it is used as a synonym of lymphadenopathy.

Cervical lymphadenopathy is a sign or a symptom, not a diagnosis. The causes are varied, and may be inflammatory, degenerative, or neoplastic. In adults, healthy lymph nodes can be palpable (able to be felt), in the axilla, neck and groin. In children up to the age of 12 cervical nodes up to 1 cm in size may be palpable and this may not signify any disease. If nodes heal by resolution or scarring after being inflamed, they may remain palpable thereafter. In children, most palpable cervical lymphadenopathy is reactive or infective. In individuals over the age of 50, metastatic enlargement from cancers (most commonly squamous cell carcinomas) of the aerodigestive tract should be considered.

== Classification ==
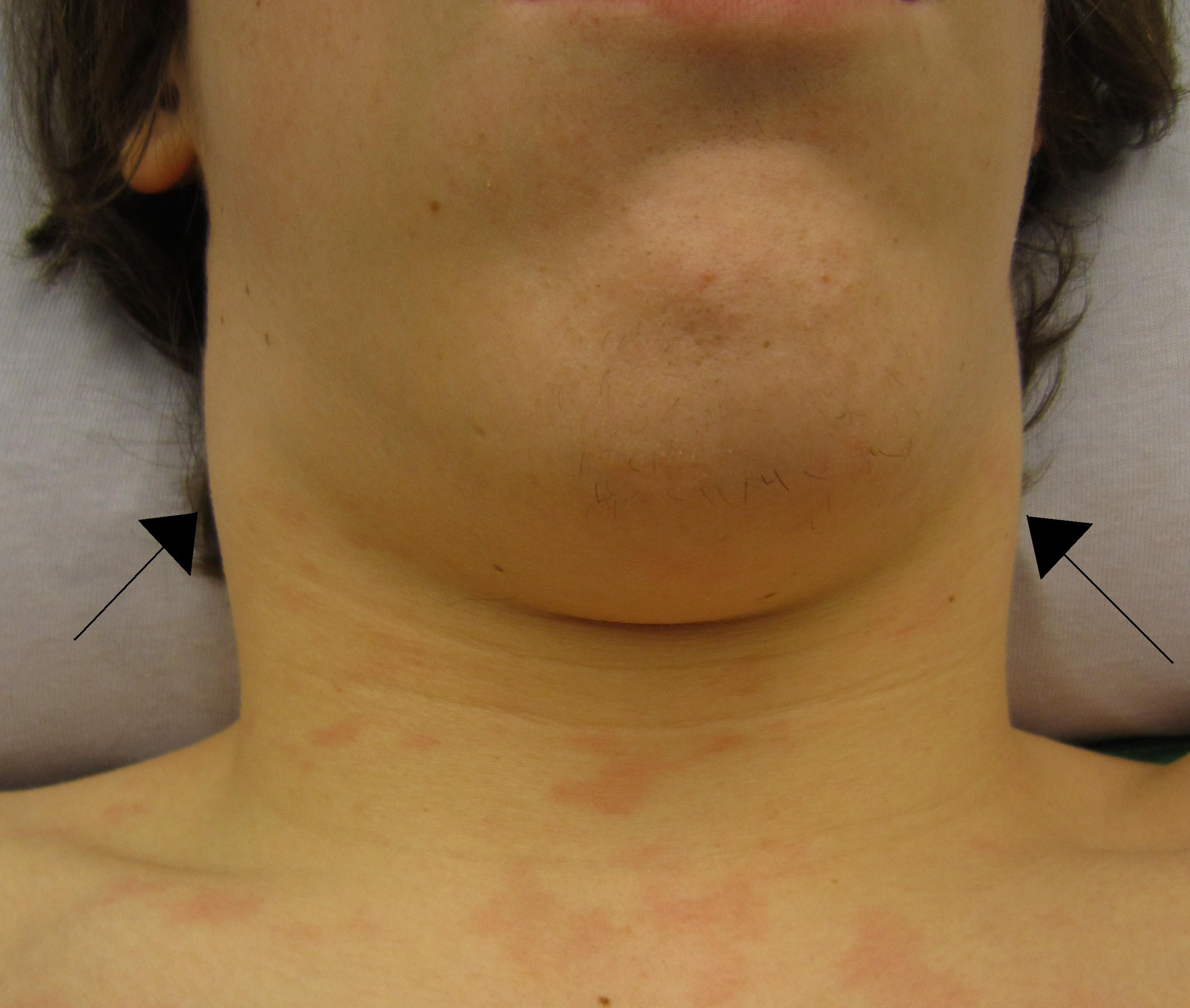
Cervical lymphadenopathy in an individual with infectious mononucleosis

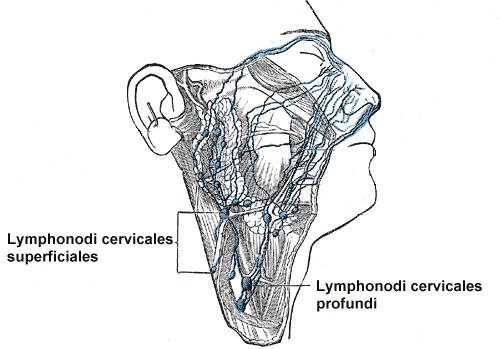
Lymph nodes in the neck

Cervical lymphadenopathy can be thought of as local where only the cervical lymph nodes are affected, or general where all the lymph nodes of the body are affected.

== Causes ==
=== Infection ===
- Pericoronitis
- Staphylococcal lymphadenitis
- Mycobacterial lymphadenitis
- Rubella
- Cat scratch fever
- Infectious mononucleosis
- Streptococcal pharyngitis
- Viral respiratory infection
- Toxoplasmosis
- Tuberculosis
- Brucellosis
- Primary herpes simplex infection (primary herpetic gingivostomatitis)
- Syphilis (secondary)
- Cytomegalovirus
- Human immunodeficiency virus
- Histoplasmosis
- Chicken pox

=== Malignancy ===
Lymph nodes may become enlarged in malignant disease. This cervical lymphadenopathy may be reactive or metastatic. Alternatively, enlarged lymph nodes may represent a primary malignancy of the lymphatic system itself, such as lymphoma (both Hodgkin's and non-Hodgkin's), lymphocytic leukemia, Lymphadenopathy that lasts less than two weeks or more than one year with no progressive size increase has a very low likelihood of being neoplastic.

Metastatic lymph nodes are enlarged because tumor cells have detached from the primary tumor and started growing in the lymph node ("seeded"). Since cancer generally occurs more frequently in older people, this kind of lymphadenopathy is more common in older persons. Metastatic lymph nodes tend to feel hard and may be fixed to underlying tissues and may or may not be tender. Usually the lymph nodes that directly drain the area of the cancer are affected by the spread (e.g. Sometimes metastatic cervical lymph node is detected before the main cancer). In such cases, this discovery leads to a search for the primary malignancy, firstly in the nearby area with endoscopy, "blind" biopsies, and tonsillectomy on the side of the lymphadenopathy. If no tumor is found, then the rest of the body is examined, looking for lung cancer or other possible sites. If still no primary tumor is detected, the term "occult primary" is used.

In lymphoma, usually there are multiple enlarged nodes which feel rubbery to palpation.

- Rhabdomyosarcoma
- Neuroblastoma

=== Other causes ===
- Surgical trauma, e.g. following a biopsy in the mouth
- Kawasaki disease,
- Kikuchi-Fujimoto disease
- Rosai-Dorfman disease
- Castleman disease
- Sarcoidosis
- Lupus erythematosus
- Cyclic neutropenia
- Orofacial granulomatosis

== Diagnosis ==
In possible malignancy, it is routine to perform a throat examination including mirror and/or endoscopy.

On ultrasound, B-mode imaging depicts lymph node morphology, whilst power Doppler can assess the vascular pattern. B-mode imaging features that can distinguish metastasis and lymphoma include size, shape, calcification, loss of hilar architecture, as well as intranodal necrosis. Soft tissue edema and nodal matting on B-mode imaging suggests tuberculous cervical lymphadenitis or previous radiation therapy. Serial monitoring of nodal size and vascularity are useful in assessing treatment response.

Fine needle aspiration cytology (FNAC) has a sensitivity and specificity percentages of 81% and 100%, respectively, in the histopathology of malignant cervical lymphadenopathy. PET-CT has proven to be helpful in identifying occult primary carcinomas of the head and neck, especially when applied as a guiding tool prior to panendoscopy, and may induce treatment related clinical decisions in up to 60% of cases.
