= Pyostomatitis vegetans =

Medical condition

Pyostomatitis vegetans is an inflammatory stomatitis and most often seen in association with inflammatory bowel disease, namely ulcerative colitis and Crohn's disease. Uncommonly, it may be one of the features of orofacial granulomatosis.

== Diagnosis ==
Features that are helpful in establishing the diagnosis of pyostomatitis vegetans are snail track appearance of oral lesions, an associated IBD (which is not always symptomatic), evidence of intraepithelial clefting on microscopic examination of oral lesions, and peripheral blood eosinophilia.

== Treatment ==
There is no established therapeutic protocol for PSV and management primarily consists of topical and systemic corticosteroids, antirheumatic drugs (sulfasalazine, mesalazine), monoclonal antibody (infliximab, adalimumab) immunosuppressives (azathioprine, methotrexate), antibiotics (dapsone), or a combination of these.

== See also ==
- Cheilitis
- Skin lesion
- List of cutaneous conditions
