= Munro's microabscess =

- Specialty: Dermatology

Munro's microabscess is an abscess (collection of neutrophils) in the stratum corneum of the epidermis due to the infiltration of neutrophils from papillary dermis into the epidermal stratum corneum. They are a cardinal sign of psoriasis where they are seen in the hyperkeratotic and parakeratotic areas of the stratum corneum. Munro microabscesses are not seen in seborrheic dermatitis, pityriasis rosea, lichen ruber planus nor dermatitis herpetiformis.

It is named for William John Munro (1863–1908).
