= Melkersson–Rosenthal syndrome =

- Other names: MRO, Miescher–Melkersson–Rosenthal syndrome
- This condition is inherited in an autosomal dominant manner.
- Specialty: Neurology

Melkersson–Rosenthal syndrome is a rare neurological disorder characterized by recurring facial paralysis, swelling of the face and lips (usually the upper lip: cheilitis granulomatosis) and the development of folds and furrows in the tongue (fissured tongue). Onset is in childhood or early adolescence. After recurrent attacks (ranging from days to years in between), swelling may persist and increase, eventually becoming permanent. The lip may become hard, cracked, and fissured with a reddish-brown discoloration. The cause of Melkersson–Rosenthal syndrome is unknown, but there may be a genetic predisposition. It has been noted to be especially prevalent among certain ethnic groups in Bolivia. It can be associated with Crohn's disease or sarcoidosis. Approximately 400 cases have been reported worldwide.

== Cause ==
Only genetic causation is established as it is associated with twins and family members.

== Diagnosis ==
Diagnosis is mainly based on clinical features. However, biopsy has been useful in diagnosis as well as in differentiating between the different types of the disease.

== Treatment ==
Treatment is symptomatic and may include nonsteroidal anti-inflammatory drugs (NSAIDs) and corticosteroids to reduce swelling, antibiotics and immunosuppressants. Surgery may be indicated to relieve pressure on the facial nerves and reduce swelling, but its efficacy is uncertain. Massage and electrical stimulation may also be prescribed.

== Prognosis ==
Melkersson–Rosenthal syndrome may recur intermittently after its first appearance. It can become a chronic disorder. Follow-up care should exclude the development of Crohn's disease or sarcoidosis.

== Eponym ==
The condition is named after Ernst Melkersson and Curt Rosenthal.

== Research ==
The NINDS supports research on neurological disorders such as Melkersson–Rosenthal syndrome. Much of this research is aimed at increasing knowledge of these disorders and finding ways to treat, prevent, and ultimately cure them.

== See also ==
- List of cutaneous conditions
