= Burrill Bernard Crohn =

American gastroenterologist (1884–1983)

- Born: June 13, 1884; New York, New York, U.S.
- Died: July 29, 1983 (aged 99); New Milford, Connecticut, U.S.
- Education: College of Physicians & Surgeons – Columbia University – Class of 1908
- Known for: Crohn's disease
- Scientific career
- Fields: Gastroenterology
- Workplaces: Mount Sinai Hospital, New York

Burrill Bernard Crohn (June 13, 1884 – July 29, 1983) was an American gastroenterologist who made the first major advance to identify Crohn's disease, which bears his name. Although the description of Crohn's disease is his most famous accomplishment, Crohn had a long career as a clinician and a researcher who contributed to modern understanding of many gastrointestinal conditions.

== Early life ==
Crohn was born on June 13, 1884, in East Harlem in New York City to Theodore and Leah Crohn, who were Jewish emigrants from Europe. He was one of 12 children.

== Education and work ==
Crohn received his bachelor's degree from City College of New York in 1902. He received a medical degree from Columbia University College of Physicians and Surgeons in 1907. Crohn first became an intern at Mount Sinai Hospital in 1907. He was promoted to head of gastroenterology in 1920, the same year he joined the staff of Columbia University.

Working with colleagues at Mount Sinai Hospital, Crohn identified fourteen patients whose symptoms and intestinal abnormalities discovered at surgery, while consistent with each other, did not fit any previously identified disease. Crohn, along with Leon Ginzburg and Gordon Oppenheimer, prepared the classic paper describing this new condition. This paper was read at a professional meeting in May 1932 and published in the Journal of the American Medical Association in October 1932. The title of the published paper was "Regional Ileitis: A Pathologic and Clinical Entity". Crohn's work with his own patients as well as research on 1,500 similar cases helped correct the thinking that the ailment was actually a form of tuberculosis rather than an inflammatory disease of the gastrointestinal tract. Crohn's work built on the work of Dr. Kennedy Dalziel of Glasgow into regional enteritis twenty years earlier. It was the British delegation to an international congress of gastroenterology who named the condition Crohn's disease of the colon, despite Dr. Crohn's requests to the contrary. Crohn preferred using the medically descriptive terms "regional ileitis" and "regional enteritis" to "Crohn's disease".

Some of Crohn's initial research into the causes of the Crohn's disease was centered around his personal conviction that it was caused by the same pathogen, a bacterium called Mycobacterium paratuberculosis (MAP), responsible for the similar condition that afflicts cattle called Johne's disease. However, he was unable to isolate the pathogen—most likely because M. paratuberculosis sheds its cellular wall in humans and takes the form of a spheroplast, making it virtually undetectable under an optical microscope. This theory has resurfaced in recent years and has been lent more credence with the arrival of more sophisticated methods of identifying MAP bacteria.

Crohn noted that it can be difficult for physicians to correctly differentiate neuroses from diseases of the organs. He said that all doctors will occasionally mistake diseases of the organs for neuroses or vice versa.

For most of his long career, Crohn had a private practice in New York City and was associated chiefly with Mount Sinai Hospital. At Mount Sinai, he worked with the neurologist Bernard Sachs (1858–1944). He also spent time working with Jesse Shapiro, M.D., another doctor very involved with Crohn's research. As Dr. Shapiro had been diagnosed with Crohn's himself, he had a born devotion to curing the disease. Crohn soon built a very large and successful practice in gastroenterology, specializing in patients with inflammatory bowel disease, including Crohn's disease. He was elected president of the American Gastroenterological Association in 1932. He received numerous awards and professional honors, wrote extensively for doctors and the general public, and was asked to consult on high-profile patients from all over the U.S. and abroad. When President Dwight D. Eisenhower had surgery for ileitis in 1956, journalists called him for three days straight to ask him about the condition; Crohn told the journalists, who then reassured American newspaper readers, that the President's surgery was simple and that the President would heal quickly.

During his career, Crohn wrote three books, Affections of the Stomach (1927), Understand Your Ulcer (1943), and Regional Ileitis (1947, second edition 1958). He also wrote more than 100 articles for professional journals.

When asked why he went into medicine, Crohn said he wanted to help his father, Theodore, who suffered from severe indigestion.

== Personal life ==
Crohn married Lucile Pels in 1912, and had two children, Edward Crohn (1917–2013), a physician, and Ruth Crohn Dickler (1914–2016) a New York City resident, known for her philanthropy. They divorced in 1927. He later married Rose Blumenthal in 1948.

In addition to practicing medicine, Crohn enjoyed painting and studying the history of the American Civil War. Crohn's watercolors were frequently displayed in galleries in New Milford, Connecticut.

Crohn practiced medicine until he was 90, splitting time in his later years between the Upper East Side of Manhattan and a country home in New Milford, Connecticut. After a brief illness, Crohn died on July 29, 1983, at the age of 99.

The Burrill B. Crohn Research Foundation was established at Mount Sinai in 1983 with initial funding from Rose Crohn and later his daughter, Ruth Crohn Dickler.

== Works ==
- Crohn, Burrill Bernard (1927). Affections of the Stomach. W. B. Saunders.
- Crohn, Burrill Bernard; Bayard, Sylvia (1945). Understand Your Ulcer: A Manual for the Ulcer Patient. Medical Publications.
- Crohn, Burrill Bernard; Yarnis, Harry (1958). Regional Ileitis. Grune & Stratton.

== Sources ==
- Crohn BB, Ginzburg L, Oppenheimer GD. Regional ileitis; a pathological and clinical entity. JAMA, 1932;99:1323-1329.
