= Ileitis =

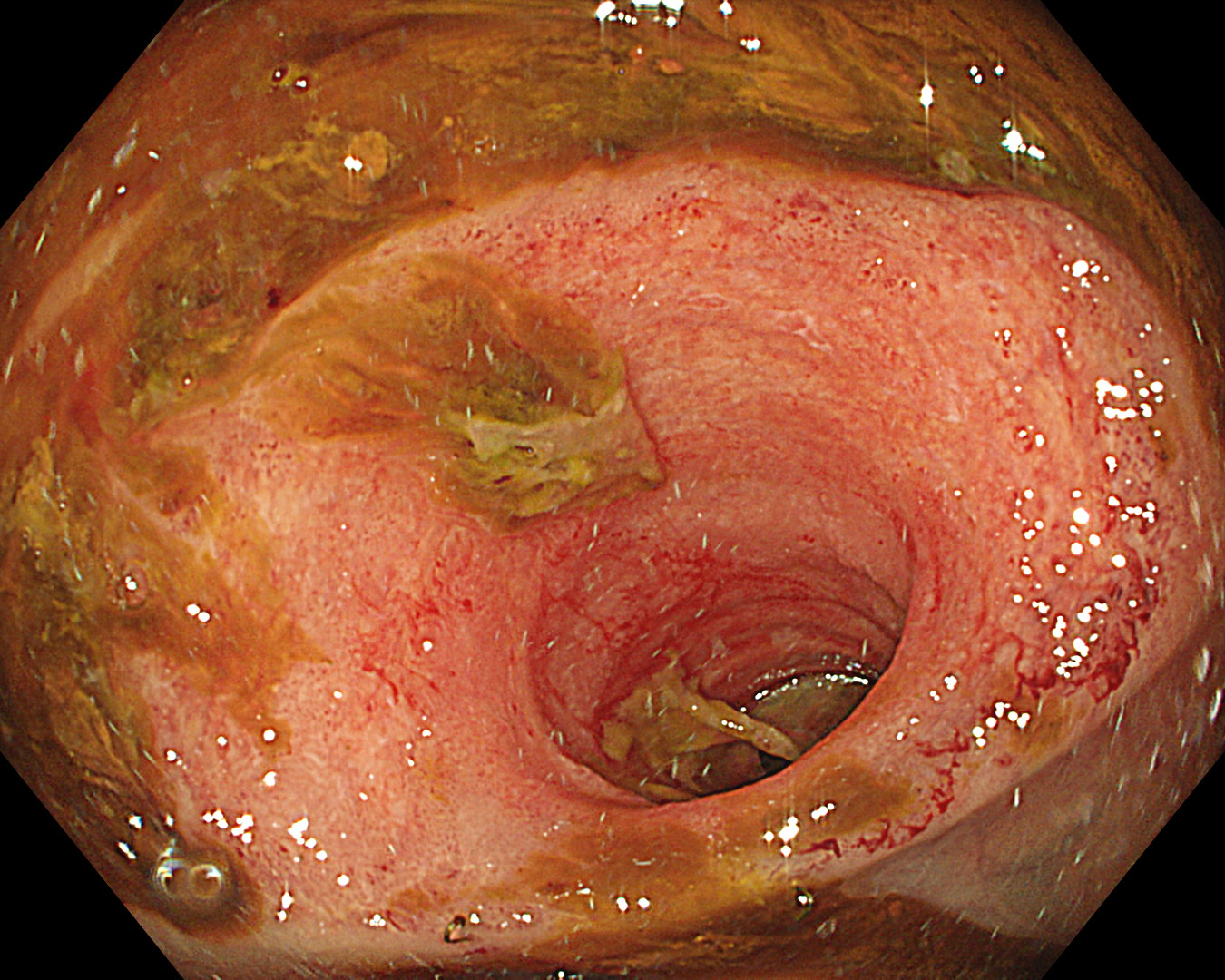
- Ileitis caused by capecitabine.
- Specialty: Gastroenterology

Ileitis is an inflammation of the ileum, a portion of the small intestine. Mycobacterium tuberculosis infection may mimic Crohn's disease Ileitis. Ileitis may be linked to a broad range of illnesses, such as sarcoidosis, amyloidosis, ischemia, neoplasms, spondyloarthropathies, vasculitides, drug-related conditions, and eosinophilic enteritis.`

== Signs and symptoms ==
When it comes to ileitis, the majority of cases are characterized by an acute, self-limited form of lower right quadrant pain and/or diarrhea. However, other conditions, such as M. tuberculosis or vasculitis, can cause chronic, debilitating symptoms that are complicated by hemorrhage, obstructive symptoms, and/or extraintestinal manifestations. Unless symptoms indicate that additional testing is necessary, ileitis linked to spondyloarthropathy or nonsteroidal anti-inflammatory drugs is usually subclinical and goes unnoticed.

== See also ==
- Enteritis
- Gastritis
