= Alexander Ecker =

German anthropologist and anatomist (1816–1887)

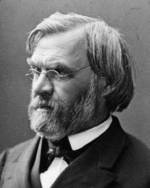
- Born: Johann Alexander Ecker; 10 July 1816; Freiburg im Breisgau, Grand Duchy of Baden
- Died: 20 May 1887 (aged 70); Freiburg im Breisgau, Grand Duchy of Baden, German Empire
- Occupation: Prosector
- Children: 1
- Parents: Johann Matthias Alexander Ecker (father); Anna von Mederer (mother)

Academic background
- Education: University of Freiburg
- Thesis: (1837)
- Doctoral advisor: Karl Heinrich Baumgärtner

Academic work
- Discipline: Anthropology
- Sub-discipline: Physiology and comparative anatomy
- Institutions: Heidelberg University; University of Basel; University of Freiburg
- Notable ideas: Ecker's fissure

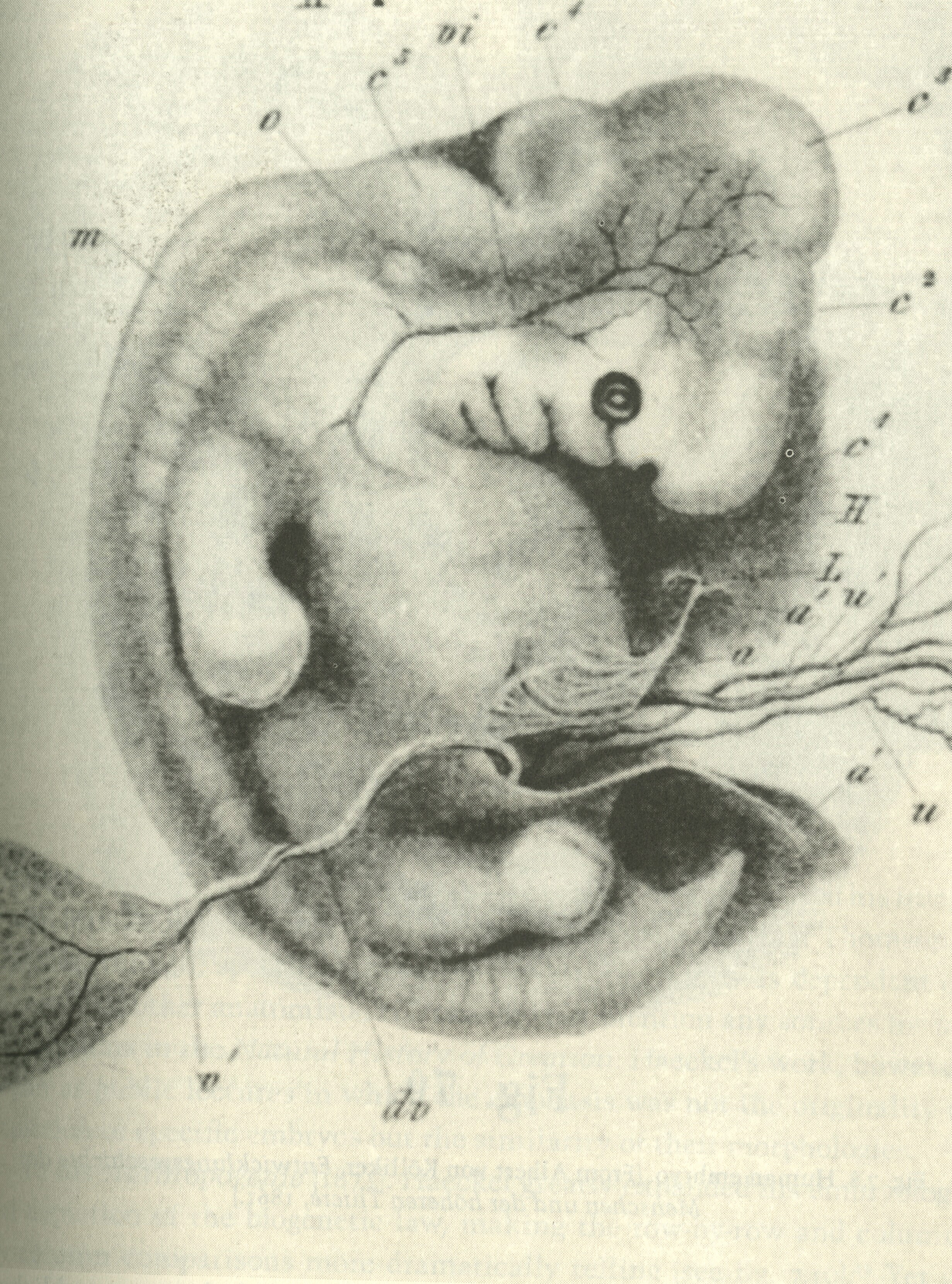
Picture of a human embryo, from Ecker's "Icones physiologicae" (1851-1859).

Johann Alexander Ecker (10 July 1816 – 20 May 1887) was a German anthropologist and anatomist, born in Freiburg im Breisgau. He was the son of Johann Matthias Alexander Ecker (1766–1829), a professor at the University of Freiburg.

== Biography ==
He studied medicine at the University of Freiburg as a pupil of Karl Heinrich Baumgärtner. He received his medical doctorate at Freiburg in 1837. In 1840 he started work as a prosector at the University of Heidelberg, where during the following year, he became a privat-docent. At Heidelberg, his influences included Friedrich Tiedemann, Friedrich August Benjamin Puchelt, Theodor Ludwig Wilhelm Bischoff and Maximilian Joseph von Chelius. In 1844 he became a full professor at Basel, later returning to Freiburg as a professor of physiology and comparative anatomy (1850). In 1870 he was co-founder of the Akademische Gesellschaft.

As an anthropologist, Ecker conducted excavations of early burial sites in the Kaiserstuhl region of southwestern Germany. At the University of Freiburg, he created a museum of anthropology and ethnography (Museum für Urgeschichte und Ethnographie). With prehistorian Ludwig Lindenschmit the Elder (1809–1893), he founded the first German journal of anthropology, the Archiv für Anthropologie.

Ecker conducted anatomical studies of the brain, being known for his investigations of cerebral convolutions in the fetus. His name is associated with "Ecker's fissure", also known as the petro-occipital fissure.

He died in Freiburg im Breisgau.

In Freiburg, a thoroughfare known as the Eckerstraße was named in his honor until 2017, when it was renamed Ernst-Zermelo-Straße.

== Selected works ==
- Physiologische Untersuchungen über die Bewegungen des Gehirns und Rückenmarks. Stuttgart, 1843 – Physiological studies relating to movements of the brain and spinal cord.
- Icones physiologicae. Erläuterungstafeln zur Physiologie und Entwicklungsgeschichte. Leipzig, Voss, 1851–1859 – Physiological icons : Explanatory panels on physiology and evolution.
- Crania Germaniae meridionais occidentalis : Beschreibung und Abbildung von Schädeln früherer und heutiger Bewohner des südwestlichen Deutschlands und insbesondere des Grossherzogthums Baden. Freiburg im Breisgau : Wagner 1865 – "Crania Germaniae Meridionais occidentalis": Description and illustration of skulls of previous and modern inhabitants of southern Germany, in particular, within the Grand Duchy of Baden.
- Die Hirnwindungen des Menschen nach eigenen Untersuchungen, insbesondere über die Entwicklung derselben beim Fötus und mit Rücksicht auf das Bedürfniss der Ärzte dargestellt. Braunschweig, 1869; second edition, 1883 – Cerebral convolutions of humans, in particular, in regards to the development of the fetus, etc.
- Lorenz Oken, eine biographische Skizze. Stuttgart, 1869. English 1883 – Biographical sketch of Lorenz Oken.
