= Leopold Fischer =

Leopold Fischer may refer to:

- Agehananda Bharati (1923–1991), Hindu monk and Sanskritist, born under the name Leopold Fischer
- Leopold Heinrich Fischer (1817–1866), German zoologist and mineralogist
- Leo Fischer (1897–1970), sports editor
- Leopold Fischer (photographer), Austrian police officer and photographer
