= Mastoid part of the temporal bone =

Back part of the sides of the skull base

- Side view of head, showing mastoid part of the temporal bone at right

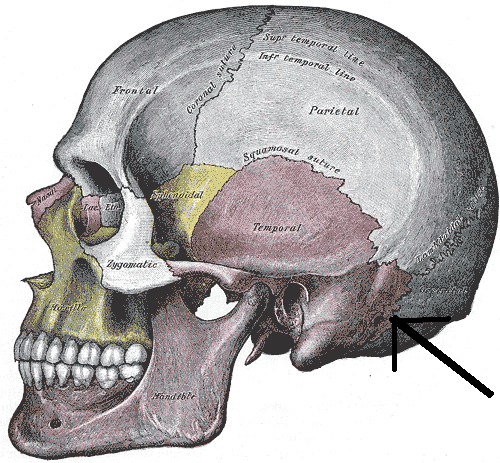
- Occipitomastoid suture (Temporal bone is in purple, and the mastoid portion is immediately to the left of the tip of the arrow.)

Details

Identifiers
- Latin: pars mastoidea ossis temporalis
- FMA: 56088

The mastoid part of the temporal bone is the posterior (back) part of the temporal bone, one of the bones of the skull. Its rough surface gives attachment to various muscles (via tendons) and it has openings for blood vessels. From its borders, the mastoid part articulates with two other bones.

In other mammals, the mastoid region forms a part of the petrosal bone, itself a fusion of the prootic, opisthotic, and possibly epiotic.

== Etymology ==
The word "mastoid" is derived from the Greek word for "breast", a reference to the shape of this bone.

== Surfaces ==
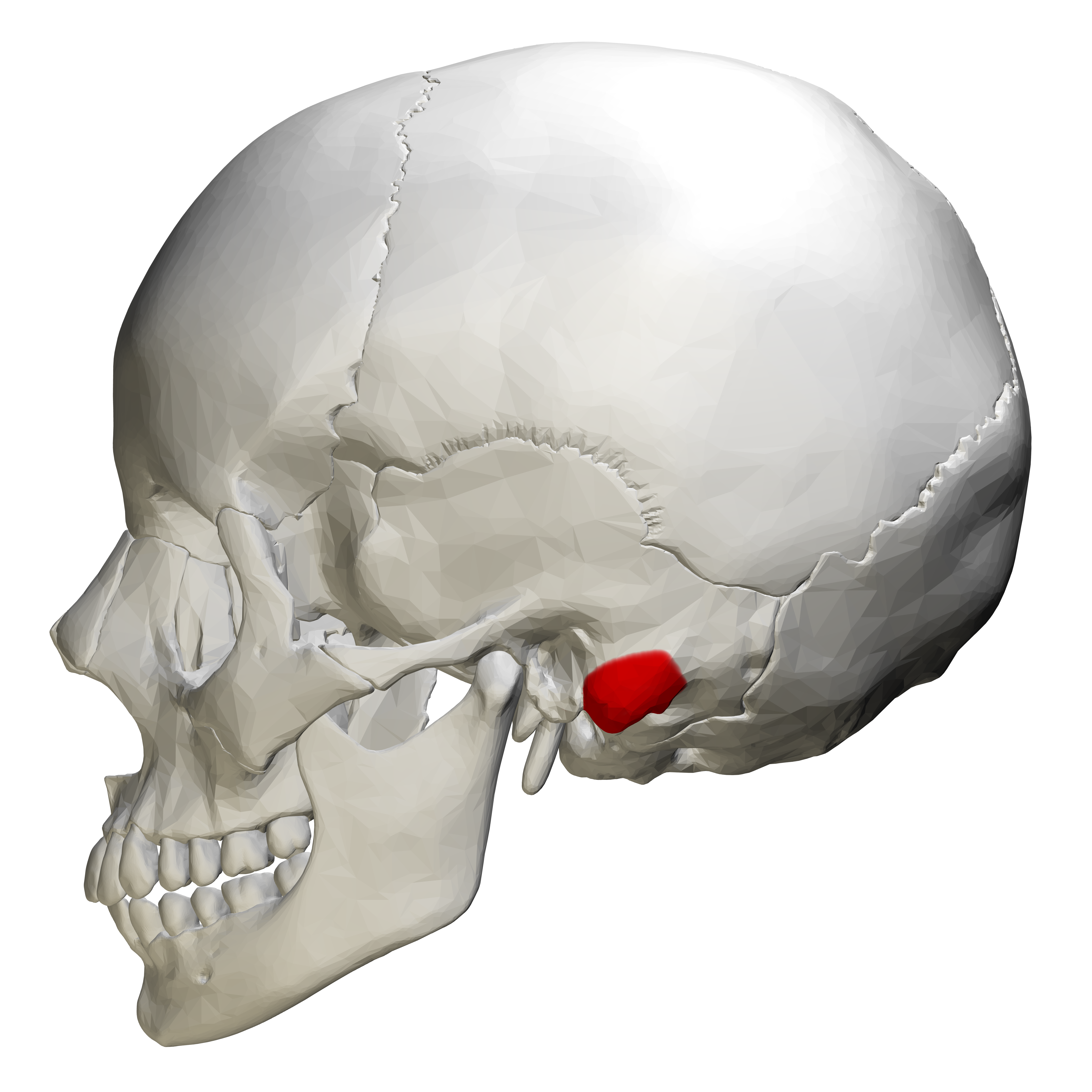
Mastoid process shown in red

=== Outer surface ===
Its outer surface is rough and gives attachment to the occipitalis and posterior auricular muscles. It is perforated by numerous foramina (holes); for example, the mastoid foramen is situated near the posterior border and transmits a vein to the transverse sinus and a small branch of the occipital artery to the dura mater. The position and size of this foramen are very variable; it is not always present; sometimes it is situated in the occipital bone, or in the suture between the temporal and the occipital.

=== Mastoid process ===
The mastoid process is located posterior and inferior to the ear canal, lateral to the styloid process, and appears as a conical or pyramidal projection. It forms a bony prominence behind and below the ear. It has variable size and form (e.g. it is larger in the male than in the female). It is also filled with sinuses, or mastoid cells. The mastoid process serves for the attachment of the sternocleidomastoid, the posterior belly of the digastric muscle, splenius capitis, and longissimus capitis. On the medial side of the process is a deep groove, the mastoid notch, for the attachment of the digastric muscle; medial to this is a shallow furrow, the occipital groove, which lodges the occipital artery. The facial nerve passes close to the mastoid process.

=== Inner surface ===
The inner surface of the mastoid portion presents a deep, curved groove, the sigmoid sulcus, which lodges part of the transverse sinus; in it may be seen in the opening of the mastoid foramen.

The groove for the transverse sinus is separated from the innermost of the mastoid cells by a very thin lamina of bone, and even this may be partly deficient.

== Borders ==
The superior border of the mastoid part is broad and serrated, for articulation with the mastoid angle of the parietal.

The posterior border, also serrated, articulates with the inferior border of the occipital between the lateral angle and jugular process.

Anteriorly, the mastoid portion is fused with the descending process of the squama above; below, it enters into the formation of the ear canal and the tympanic cavity.

== Spaces ==
A section of the mastoid process shows it to be hollowed out into a number of spaces, the mastoid cells, which exhibit the greatest possible variety as to their size and number. At the upper and front part of the process, they are large and irregular and contain air, but toward the lower part, they diminish in size, while those at the apex of the process are frequently quite small and contain marrow; occasionally, they are entirely absent, and the mastoid is then solid throughout.

In addition to these a large irregular cavity is situated at the upper and front part of the bone. It is called the tympanic antrum and must be distinguished from the mastoid cells, though it communicates with them. Like the mastoid cells, it is filled with air and lined by a prolongation of the mucous membrane of the tympanic cavity, with which it communicates. The tympanic antrum is bounded above by a thin plate of bone, the tegmen tympani, which separates it from the middle fossa of the base of the skull, below by the mastoid process, laterally by the squama just below the temporal line, and medially by the lateral semicircular canal of the internal ear, which projects into its cavity. It opens in front into that portion of the tympanic cavity which is known as the attic or epitympanic recess. The tympanic antrum is a cavity of some considerable size at the time of birth; the mastoid air cells may be regarded as diverticula from the antrum and begin to appear at or before birth. By the fifth year, they are well-marked, but their development is not completed until toward puberty.

== Development ==
The mastoid process is absent or rudimentary in the neonatal skull. It forms postnatally (starts to develop after 1 year old), as the sternocleidomastoid muscle develops and pulls on the bone. It usually finishes structural development by 2 years old.

== Clinical significance ==
=== Mastoid process ===
Because of the late postnatal development of the mastoid process, antenatal injuries to the region often recover spontaneously. The largest size is found in South Africans and least found in North American Indians.

Rarely, lesions can develop on the mastoid process.

== See also ==
- Mastoiditis
- Mastoidectomy
