= Philipp Foltz =

German history painter (1805–1877)

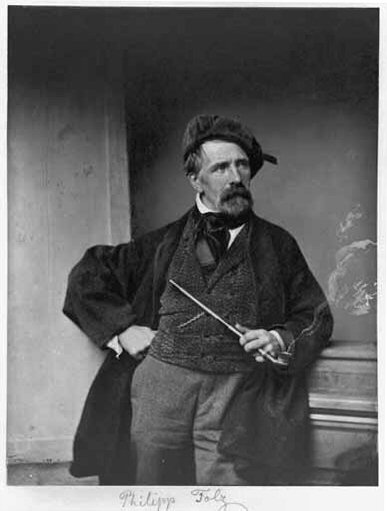
Philipp Foltz; photograph by Franz Hanfstaengl

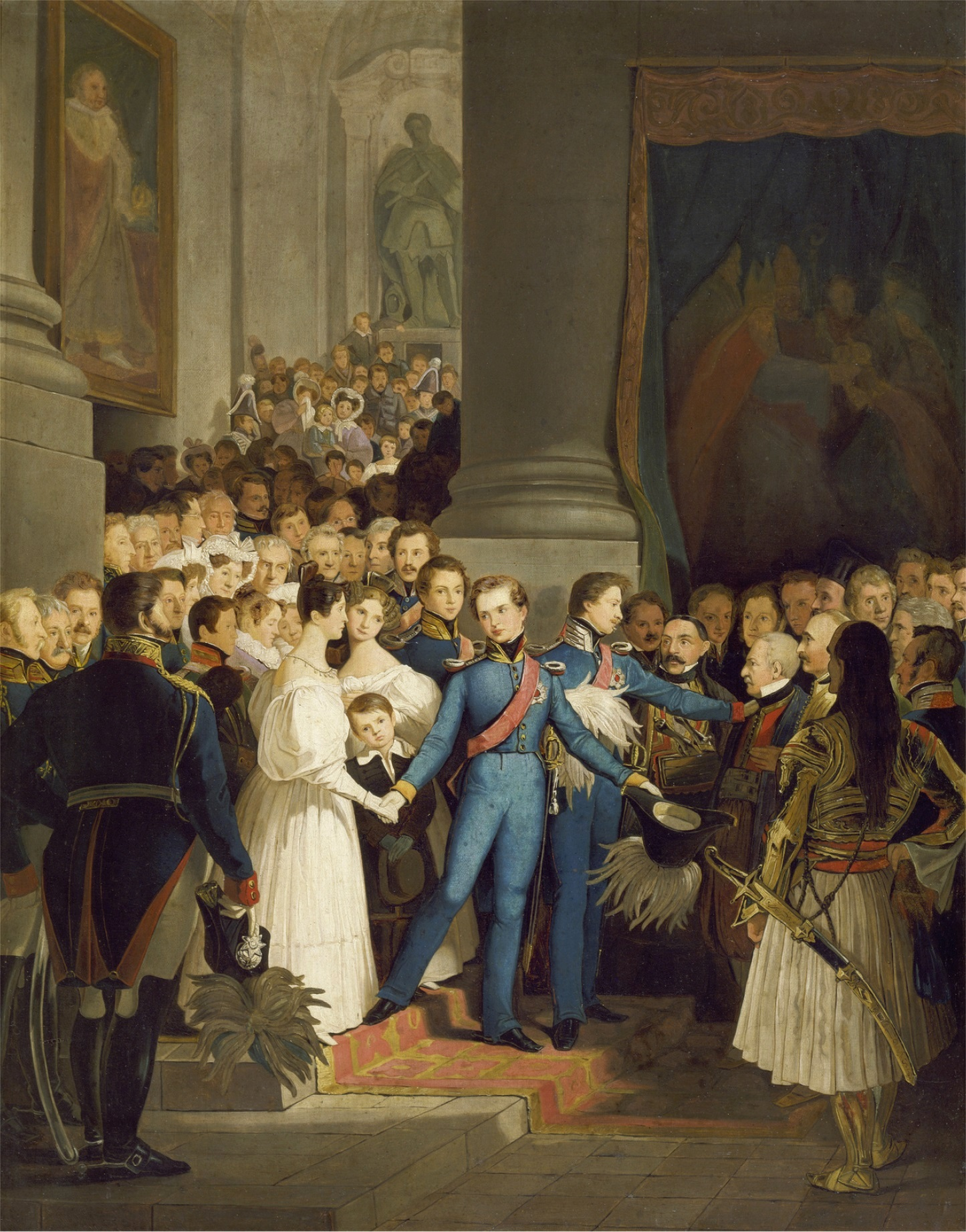
King Otto's Farewell

Philipp von Foltz (11 May 1805 – 5 August 1877) was a German history painter.

== Biography ==
He was born in Bingen am Rhein. His father, Ludwig, a painter of some note, gave him his first art lessons. In 1825, he went to Munich, where he was accepted at the Academy of Fine Arts and studied with Peter von Cornelius. Soon, he was allowed to assist Cornelius with his frescoes at the Glyptothek and the Hofgarten.

Later, he assisted Wilhelm Lindenschmit the Elder at the new Royal Palace, creating murals based on the ballads of Friedrich Schiller. At this time, he also began to create a series of oil paintings on historical subjects; notably one of King Otto saying farewell on his way to Greece.

In 1835, he took a study trip to Rome, where he created his monumental painting "Des Sängers Fluch" (The Singer's Curse), based on the poem by Ludwig Uhland. Upon his return, he was appointed a Professor at the Academy by King Maximilian II of Bavaria. In thanks, he created two monumental canvases for the Maximilianeum.

Between 1865 and 1875, he served as Director of the Royal Gallery, but was harshly criticized for his methods of restoration, which employed questionable chemical processes developed by Max von Pettenkofer, as well as the overpainting of some canvases. Despite this, he was elevated to the nobility in 1869.

His paintings are historically precise, but are now considered to be rather conservative and academic.

Foltz died in Munich in 1877.

== Sources ==
- Friedrich Pecht (1877). "Foltz, Philipp" . Allgemeine Deutsche Biographie (in German). Vol. 7. Leipzig: Duncker & Humblot. pp. 150–151.
