= Occipitomastoid suture =

Cranial suture

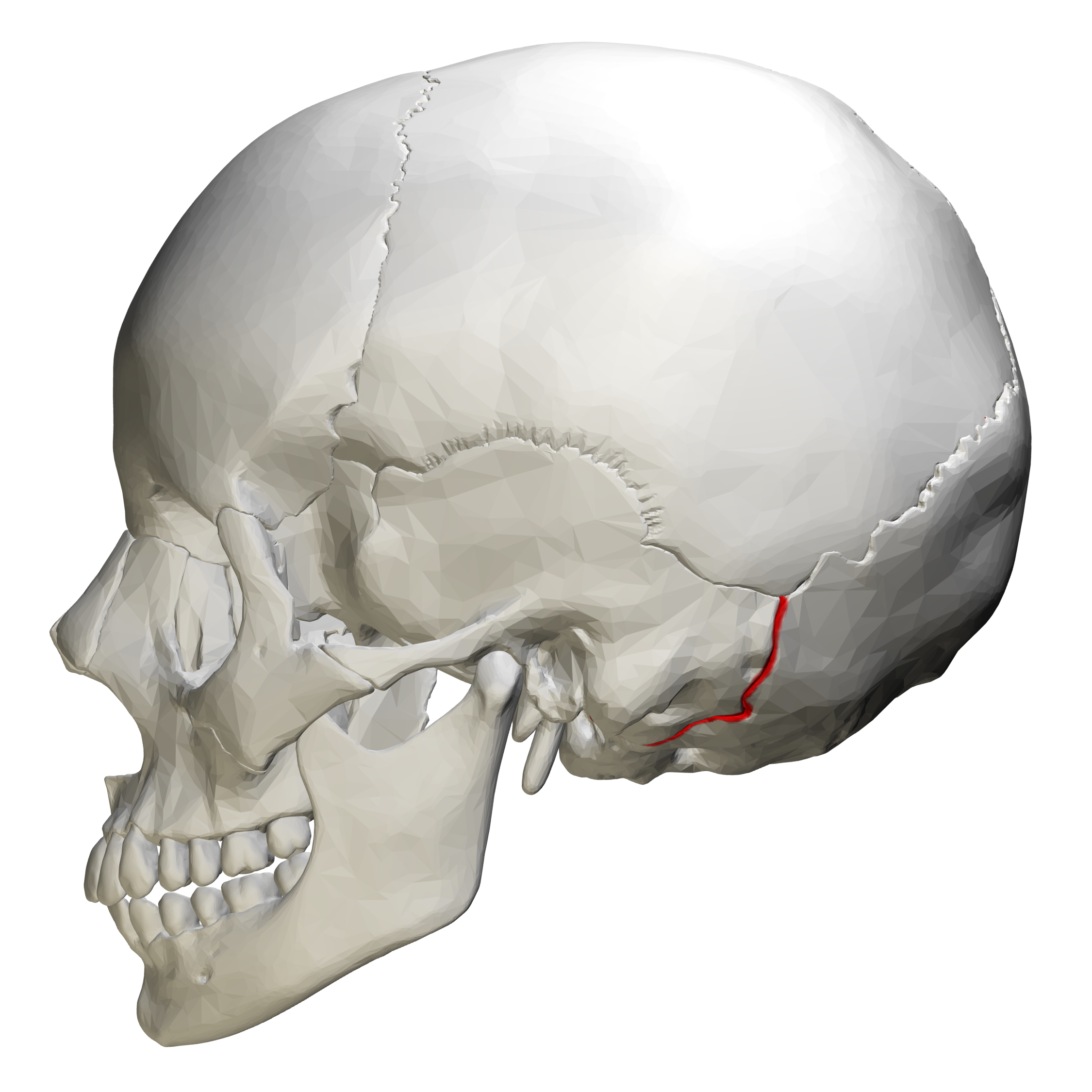
- Occipitomastoid suture (red)

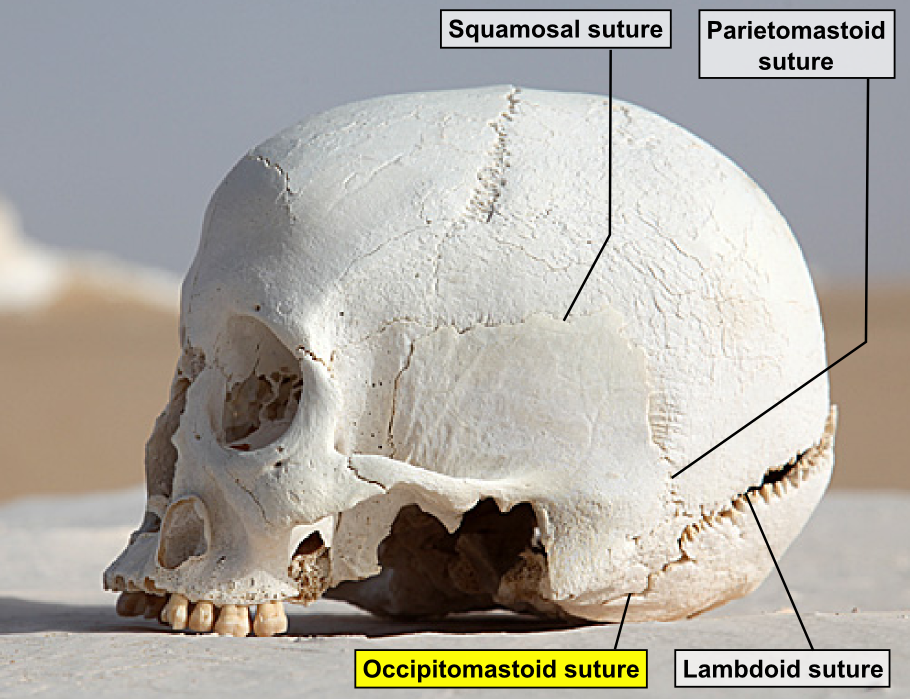
- Side view of the skull. Occipitomastoid suture labeled at bottom.

Details

Identifiers
- Latin: sutura occipitomastoidea
- TA98: A03.1.02.005
- TA2: 1578
- FMA: 52934

The occipitomastoid suture, or occipitotemporal suture, is the cranial suture between the occipital bone and the mastoid portion of the temporal bone.

It is continuous with the lambdoidal suture.

== See also ==
- Jugular foramen

== Additional images ==
Animation. Occipitomastoid suture shown in red.

Temporal bones and occipital bone, seen from inside.

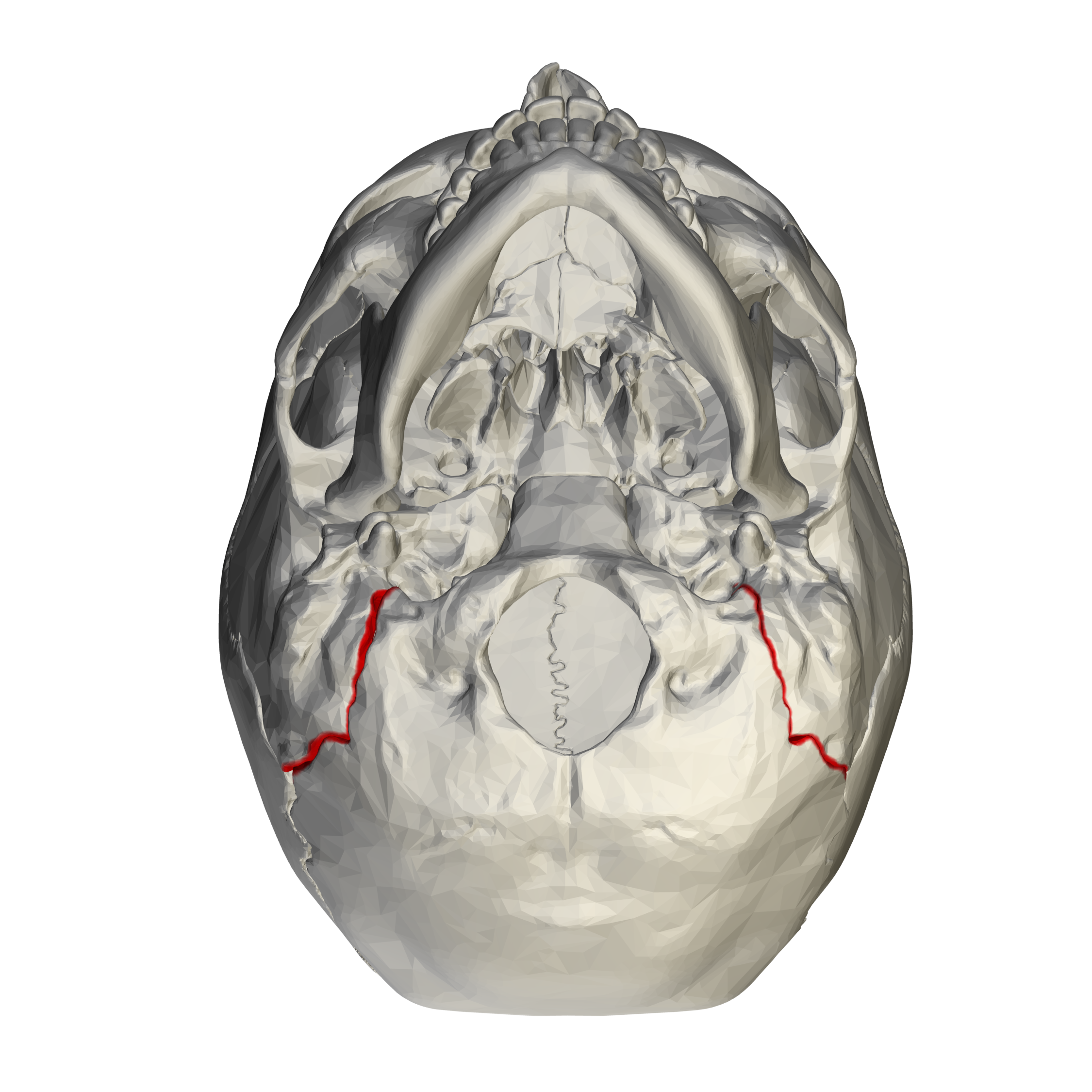
Base of skull. Inferior surface.

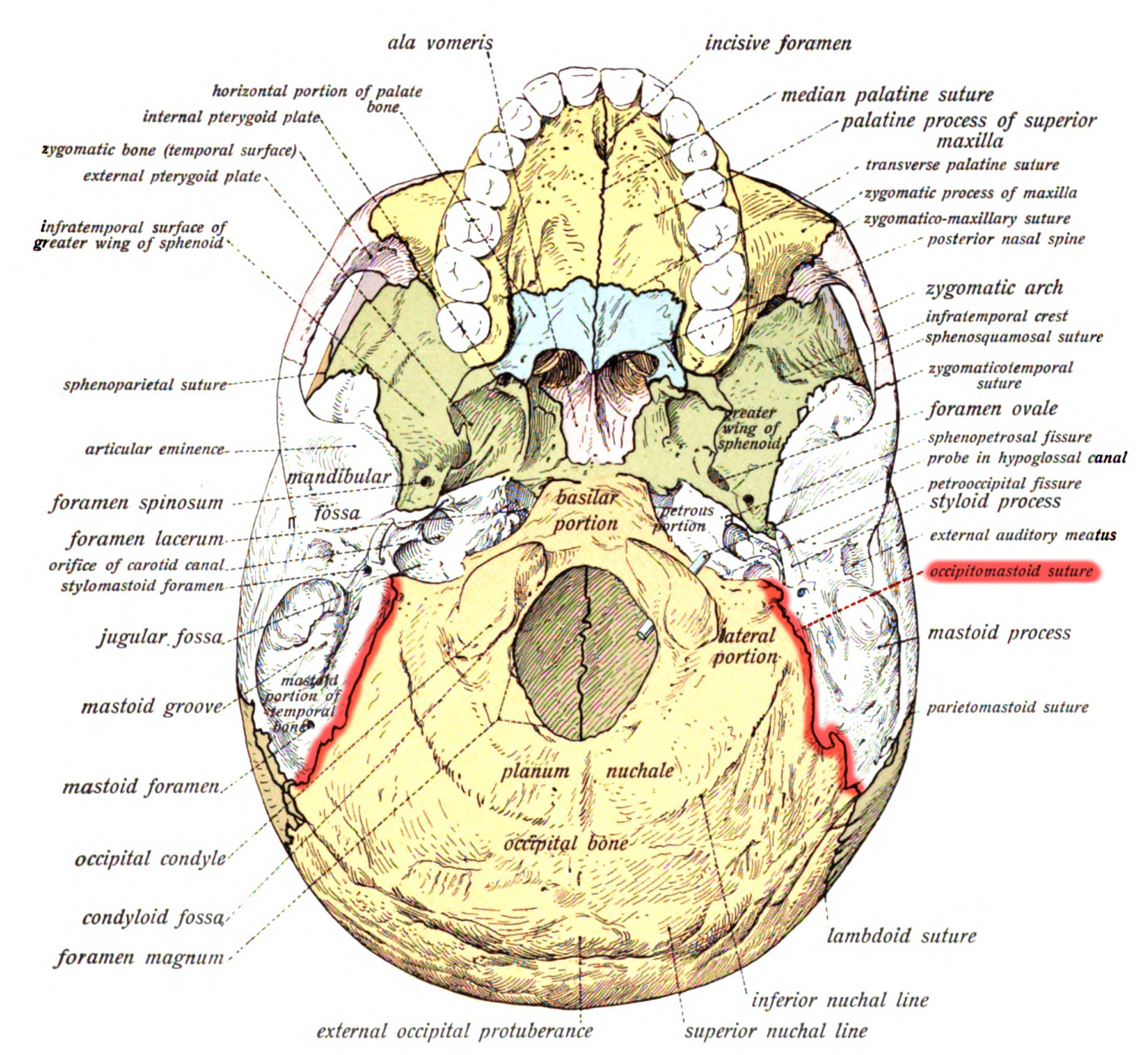
Base of skull. Inferior surface.
