= Puchelt =

Puchelt is a surname. Notable people with the surname include:

- Ernst Sigismund Puchelt (1820–1885), German jurist, a judge of the Reichsoberhandelsgericht
- Friedrich August Benjamin Puchelt (1784–1845), German pathologist
- Gerhard Puchelt (1913–1987), German pianist
