= Sphenoidal lingula =

Anatomical feature of the skull

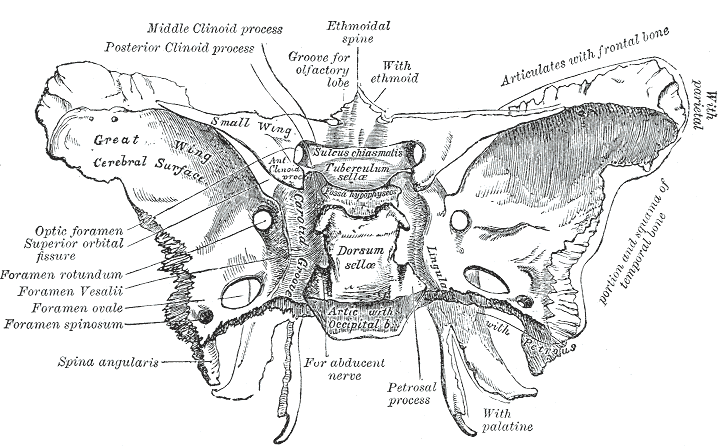
- Sphenoid bone. Upper surface. (Lingula labeled at center right.)

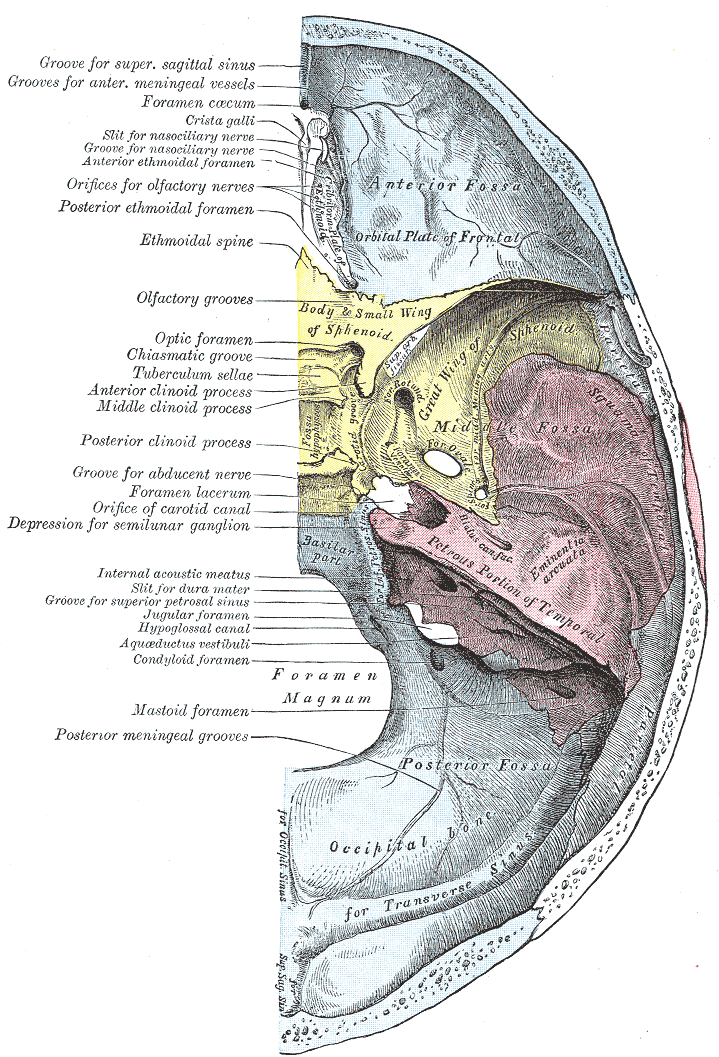
- Base of the skull. Upper surface. (Lingula not labeled, but sphenoid bone is visible in yellow, and lingula would be near foramen lacerum.)

Identifiers
- TA98: A02.1.05.013
- TA2: 597
- FMA: 54757

Along the posterior part of the lateral margin of the carotid groove of the sphenoid bone, in the angle between the body and great wing, is a ridge of bone, called the lingula.
