= August Wilhelm Dieffenbacher =

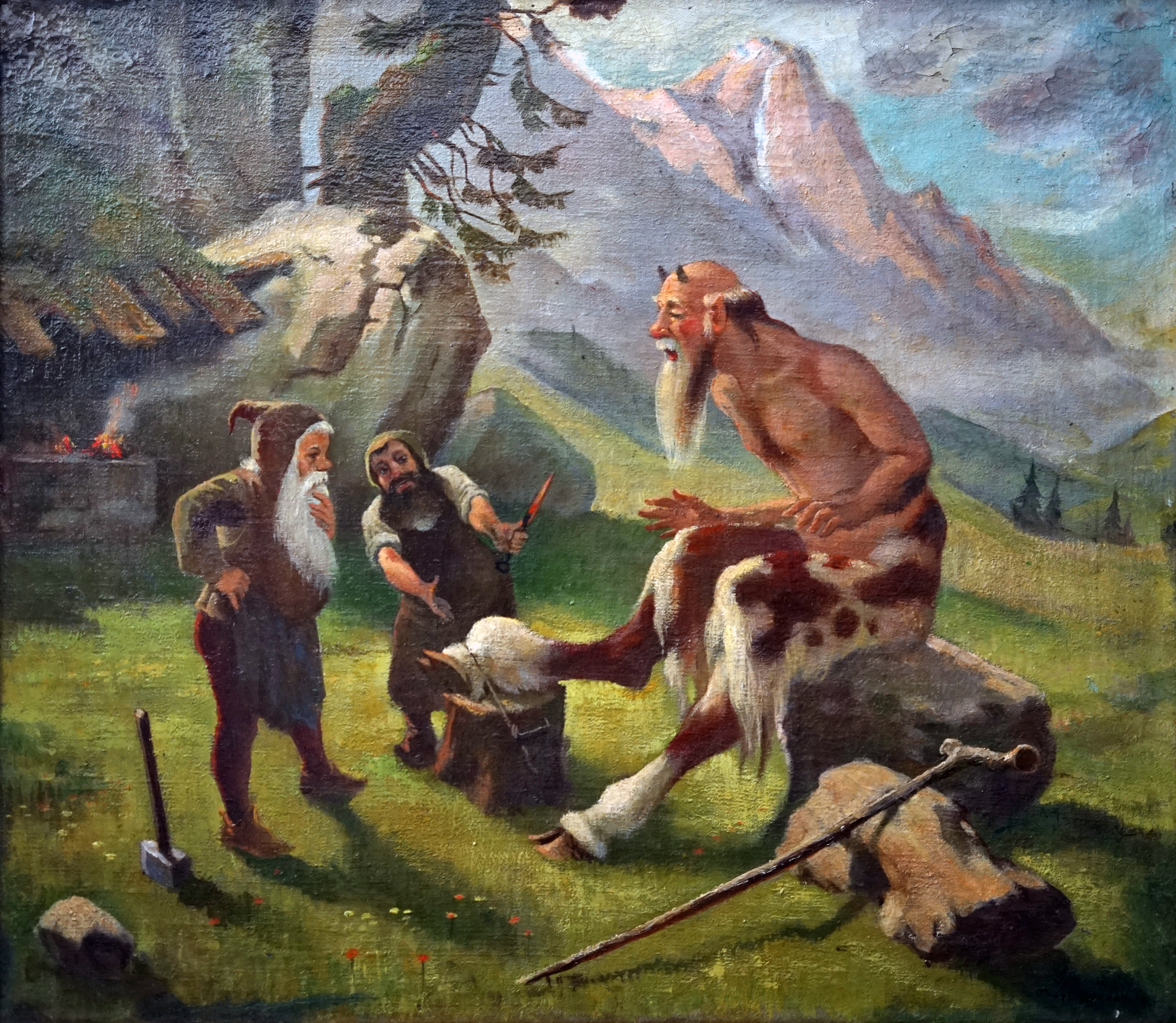
Satyr among the Dwarfs (A Painful Operation)

August Wilhelm Dieffenbacher (14 August 1858 – 14 December 1940) was a German painter and illustrator, associated with the Munich painting school.

== Life ==
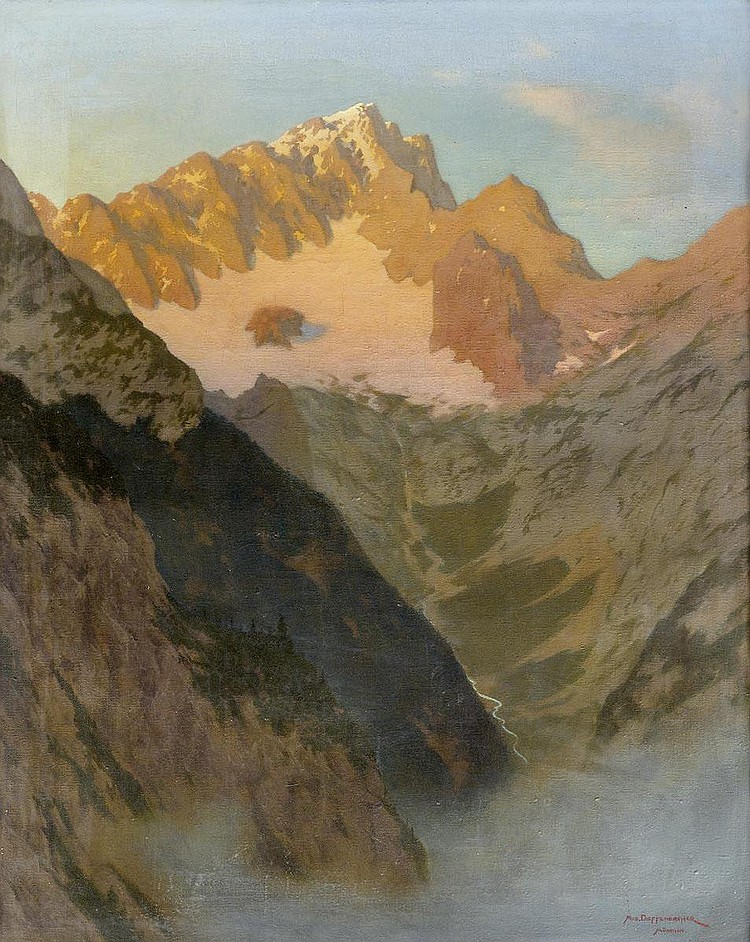
Mountain Landscape at Sunset

August Wilhelm Dieffenbacher was born in Mannheim. He received his artistic training under Ludwig von Löfftz and Wilhelm von Lindenschmit the Younger at the Royal Academy of Fine Arts in Munich.

He made his debut in 1888 with the painting Pursued (German Verfolgt) at the academy's jubilee exhibition. His works were subsequently shown at the annual exhibitions held in the Munich Glass Palace. Together with Franz von Stuck, Franz von Lenbach, Franz von Defregger and others, he also helped organize exhibitions there.

In 1900 he participated in the Paris Exposition Universelle. Dieffenbacher was a member—and for a short time the secretary—of the Allgemeine Deutsche Kunstgenossenschaft (General German Art Cooperative). He died in 1940 in Munich.

== Work ==
Dieffenbacher produced landscapes, genre scenes, and portraits. His paintings often depict scenes from early Germanic history, mythological subjects, and the everyday life of people in the mountains of Upper Bavaria. Some of his works also address social issues.

In addition to smaller formats, he created several large-scale compositions based on themes from Germanic prehistory. His works are held in museums inter alia in Mannheim, Dresden and Schwerin. Stylistically, Dieffenbacher's art stands at the transition between the history and genre painting of the 19th century and the emerging trends of early 20th-century painting.
