= Sigmoid sulcus =

Fold in the back of the temporal bone

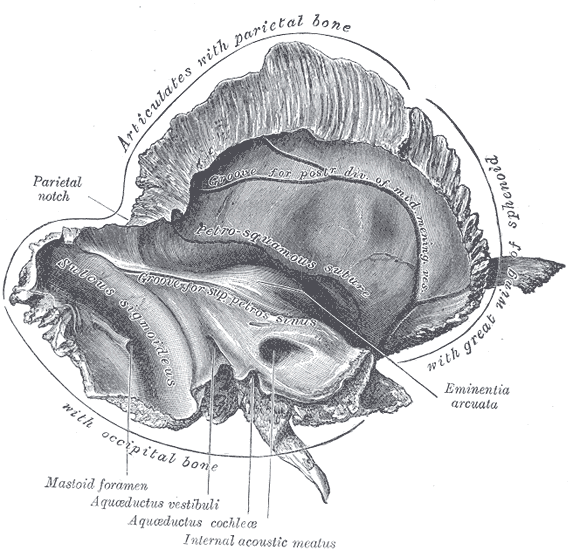
- Left temporal bone. Inner surface. (Sigmoid sulcus visible at center left.)

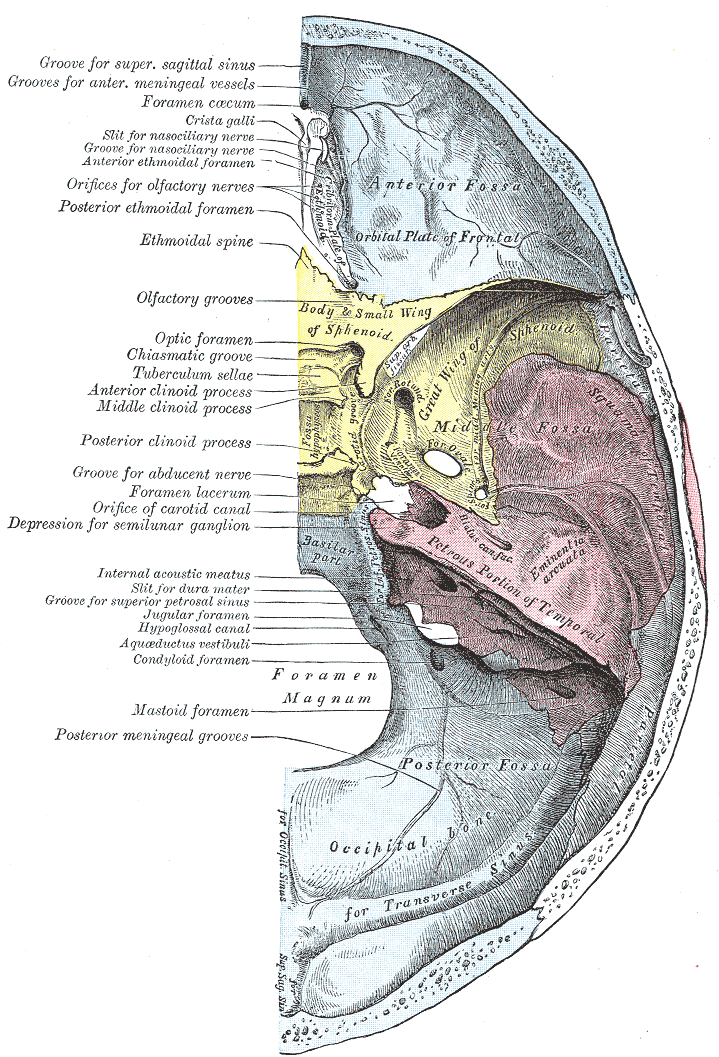
- Base of the skull. Upper surface. (Sigmoid sulcus not labeled, but is visible near mastoid foramen.)

Details

Identifiers
- Latin: sulcus sinus sigmoidei ossis temporalis
- TA98: A02.1.06.006
- TA2: 456
- FMA: 55499

The inner surface of the mastoid portion of the temporal bone presents a deep, curved groove, the sigmoid sulcus, which lodges part of the transverse sinus; in it may be seen the opening of the mastoid foramen.
