= Leopold Heinrich Fischer =

German zoologist and mineralogist

Leopold Heinrich Fischer (19 December 1817, Fribourg-en-Brisgau – 2 February 1886, Fribourg-en-Brisgau) was a German zoologist and mineralogist.

== Biography ==
He was the son of Aloys Fischer. He studied medicine at Freiburg and Vienna, and afterwards, worked as a general practitioner in Freiburg-in-Brisgau. From 1845 he taught classes in zoology and mineralogy, and in 1854 was named an associate professor of mineralogy and geology at the University of Freiburg, where in 1859 he attained a full professorship. From 1855 he served as director of the mineralogical-geognostic collection.

He was one of the top specialists in the classification of insects of his time. After much research in geology, he devoted himself to the study of prehistoric people and studied stone tools from an evolutionary point of view and also their geographical distribution. His collections are in the Naturhistorisches Museum in Vienna. With Alexander Ecker, he was co-director of the Museum für Urgeschichte und Ethnographie (Museum of Prehistory and Ethnography) at Freiburg.

Fischer was elected a member of the American Antiquarian Society in 1881.

== Published works ==
His most significant works are:

- Orthoptera Europaea (1853).
- Clavis der Silicate (1864).
- Chronologischer Überblick über die allmalige Einführung der Mikroskopie in das Studium der Mineralogie, Petrographie und Paläontologie (1868).
- Kritische mikroskopisch-mineralogische Studien (1869, 1871–73).
- Nephrit und Jadeit nach ihren mineralogischen Eigenschaften, sowie nach ihrer urgerschichtlishen und ethnographischen Bedeutung (1875).
- On stone implements in Asia; from Proceedings of American Antiquarian Society, April 30, 1884.

and many other scientific articles.
