= Emil Obrovsky =

Emil Obrovsky was a significant mid-20th-century Austrian amateur photographer and a founder of the Österreichische Gesellschaft für Photographie (Austrian Society for Photography).

== Photography ==
Obrovsky's work in both Pictorialist and documentary styles attracted international attention and he also produced Modernist semi-abstract photograms. His Pictorialist Im Hafen (In the Harbour) was included in London Salon of Photography of 1953. One commentator remarked: "From Corfu to Mount Athos was the title of Emil Obrovsky's picture of his vacation of last year, and it must be known that Obrovsky is not one of those photographers who are unconcerned about quality..."

His backlit picture of women washing laundry on a riverbank appears in MoMA's 1955 record-breaking world-touring exhibition of international photography organised by Edward Steichen, The Family of Man.

== Promotion of Austrian photography ==
In 1955, four internationally renowned photographers, Karl Piringer, Leopold Fischer, Erich Körner and Emil Obrovsky, founded the Österreichische Gesellschaft für Photographie (ÖGPh). Piringer became the first president and Obrovsky the treasurer. Membership is honorary, carrying the title "ÖGPh" or "Hon.ÖGPh"; a prerequisite for an appointment to the ÖGPh was that the candidate have at least 300 image acceptances of work into international photo salons and, in addition, a recommendation from two full members is essential.

Commensurate with the requirements of the Austrian Society, Obrovsky appears in exhibition catalogues, records and publications throughout the 1950s. Amongst these are the 1953 Royal Photographic Society Centenary Pictorial Exhibition; The American Annual of Photography; Photographische Korrespondenz: Zeitschrift für wissenschaftliche undangewandte Photographie und die gesamte Reproduktionstechnik; Foto Prisma; and Photography XX: 20th Group exhibition in San Sebastián, Spain, 1952, organized by the Sociedad Fotográfica de Guipuzcoa.

He organised the Internationale Photoausstellung Austria of 1959 and produced its catalogue.
