= Ludwig Lindenschmit the Elder =

German prehistorian and painter (1809–1893)

- Born: 4 September 1809; Mayence, Mont-Tonnerre, First French Empire
- Died: 14 February 1893 (aged 83); Mainz, Grand Duchy of Hesse, German Empire
- Education: Royal Academy of Fine Arts
- Spouse: Luise
- Children: 6
- Father: Johann Lindenschmit
- Relatives: Wilhelm Lindenschmit the Elder (brother); Wilhelm Lindenschmit the Younger (nephew)

Ludwig Lindenschmit (the Elder) (September 4, 1809 – February 14, 1893) was a German history painter, prehistorian and art instructor who was a native of Mainz. He was a younger brother to history painter Wilhelm Lindenschmit (1806–1848), and father to prehistorian Ludwig Lindenschmit (the Younger) (1850–1922).

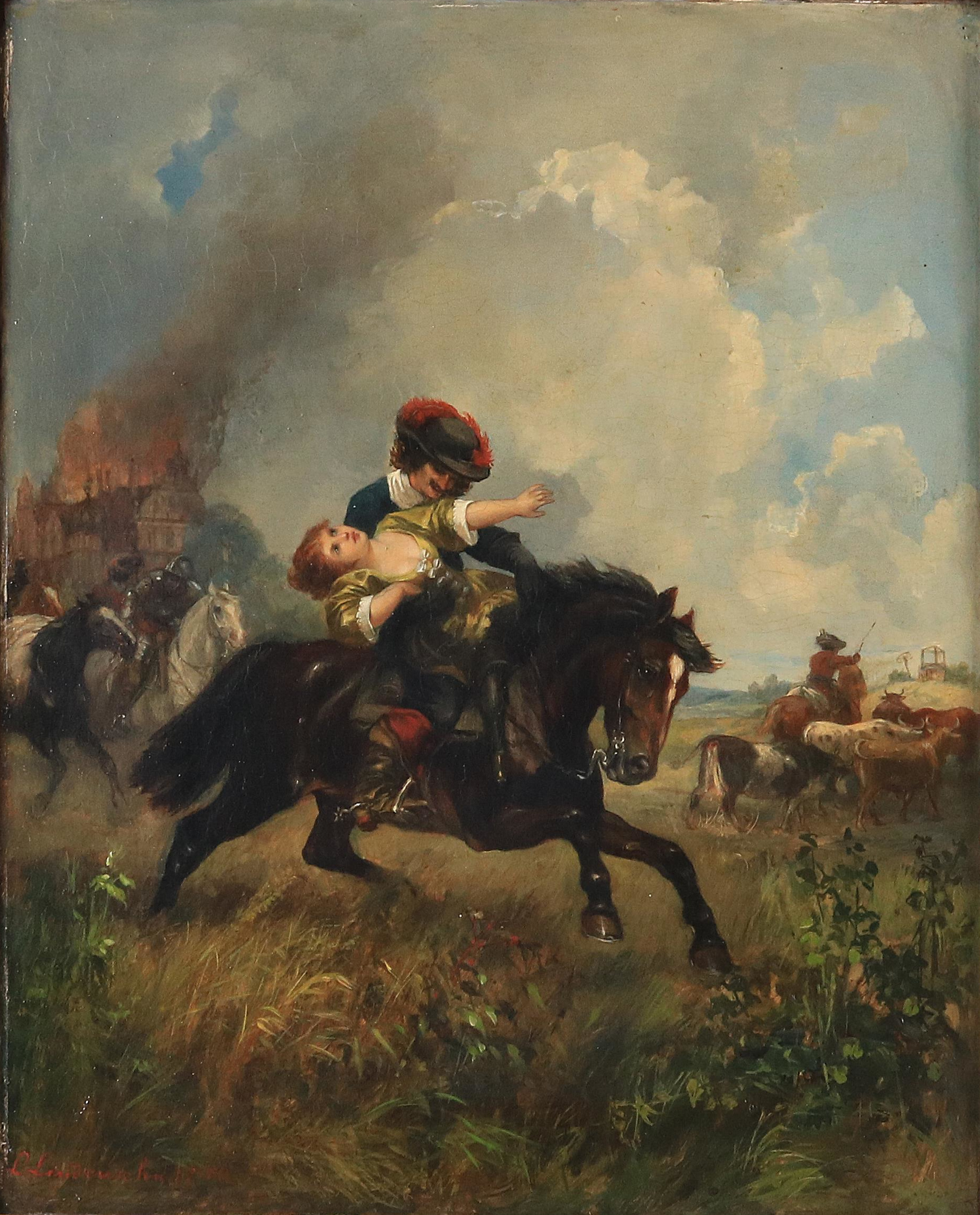
Rescue from the burning castle (1880, oil on panel)

He studied art in Vienna and Munich, and beginning in 1831, was a high school art teacher in his hometown of Mainz. Here, he taught classes in art until the 1870s, and as his career progressed, his interest in prehistoric Germanic antiquities grew.

In 1848 he published Das Germanische Totenlager von Selzen, an important treatise on Germanic sepulchral mounds. In 1851, he became head of the Romano-Germanic Central Museum in Mainz. Lindenschmit was an outspoken critic of the "three-age system" developed by archaeologist Christian Jürgensen Thomsen (1788–1865).

With anatomist Alexander Ecker (1816–1887), he founded the Archiv für Anthropologie. As a painter, he assisted his brother, Wilhelm, with the historic frescoes at Hohenschwangau Castle in the Ostallgäu district.

== Selected publications ==
- Das Germanische Totenlager von Selzen (1848).
- Die Altertümer unserer heidnischen Vorzeit (1858–90).
- Die Altertümer der merovingischen Zeit (1880–89).
- Tracht und Bewaffnung des römischen Heeres während der Kaiserzeit (1882).
