= Groove for sigmoid sinus =

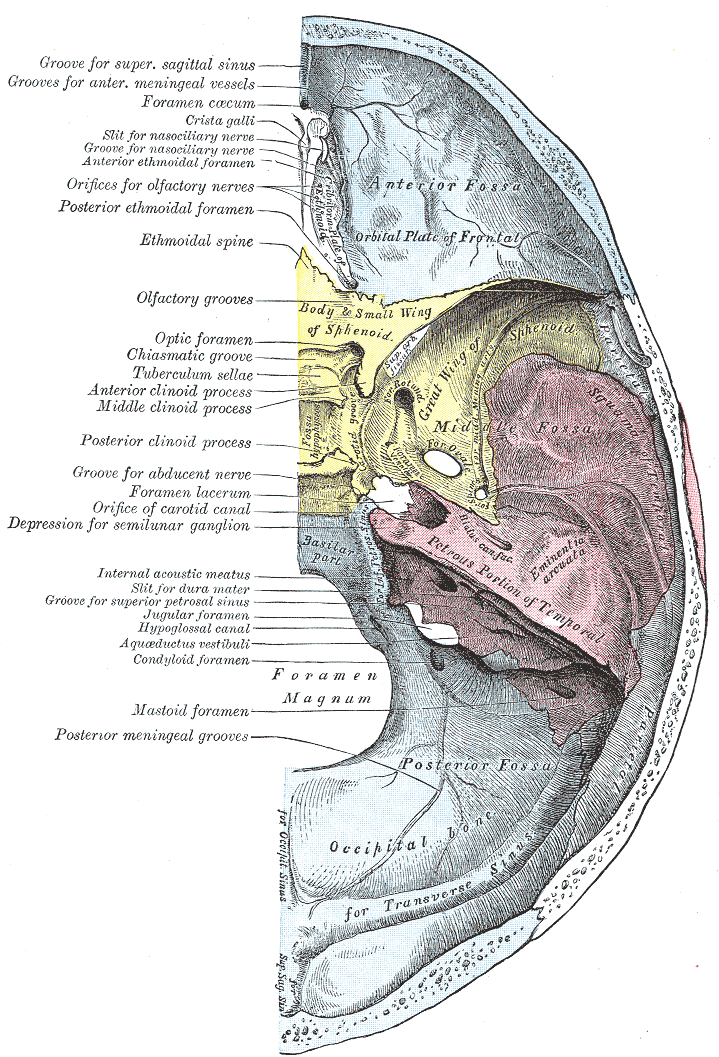
- Base of the skull. Upper surface. (Groove for sigmoid sinus not labeled, but Posterior cranial fossa is the bottommost of the three depressions.)

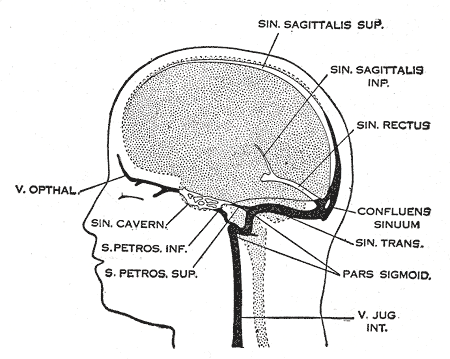
- Dural veins. ("Pars sigmoid" labeled at lower right.)

Details

Identifiers
- Latin: sulcus sinus sigmoidei ossis parietalis
- TA98: A02.1.02.003; A02.1.04.032
- TA2: 456
- FMA: 57122 57100, 57122

Groove for Sigmoid Sinus is a groove in the posterior cranial fossa. It starts at lateral parts of occipital bone, curves around jugular process, and ends at posterior inferior angle of parietal bone. After that, groove for sigmoid sinus continues as groove for transverse sinus.

== See also ==
- Sigmoid sinus
