= Petro-occipital fissure =

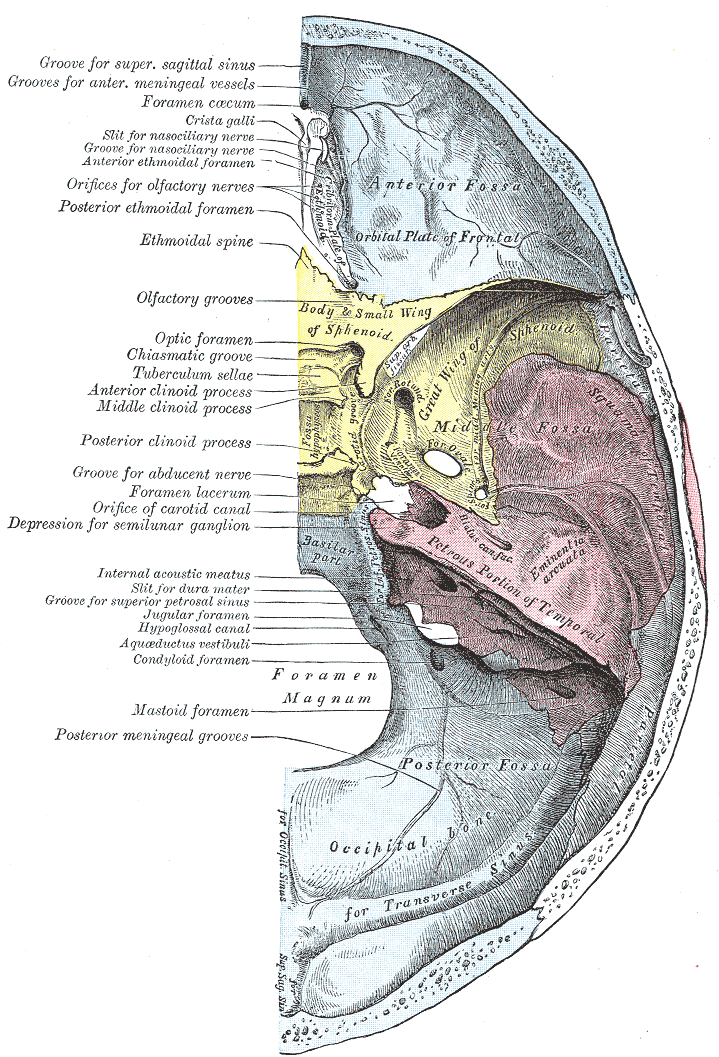
- Base of the skull. Upper surface. (Petro-occipital fissure is not labeled, but petrous portion is bottom part of temporal bone, in pink, and occipital bone is at bottom, in blue.)

Details

Identifiers
- Latin: fissura petrooccipitalis
- TA98: A02.1.00.047
- TA2: 450
- FMA: 75039

This grooved surface of the foramen magnum is separated on either side from the petrous portion of the temporal bone by the petro-occipital fissure (also Ecker fissure), which is occupied in the fresh state by a plate of cartilage; the fissure is continuous behind with the jugular foramen, and its margins are grooved for the inferior petrosal sinus.
