= Leopold Fischer (photographer) =

Austrian police officer and photographer

Leopold Fischer (1902-1978) was an Austrian police officer and much-awarded Pictorialist, and later, Modernist, photographer.

== Biography ==
Born in Vienna, and living there for much of his life from 1939 to 1962 in the one apartment-cum-studio at Passingergasse 61/9, from 1923 Fischer was a member of the Federal Security Guard (police).

== Pictorialist photographer ==
In 1924 he began his first photographic experiments and later practiced as a part-time professional photographer. From 1928 he started exhibiting internationally with success in salons, and after 1934 showed with a group of photographers of the police sports association, becoming their leader in 1938. His specialty was bromoil and the still more complex bromoil transfer process with which he produced colour-tinted prints, for which in 1943 he received a Bronze medal inscribed “Leopold Fischer, master of the Schutzpolizei in Vienna, for his achievements in the field of pictorial photography".

== Reportage ==
During WW2 Fischer produced occasional documentary photographs for war reports as part of his police work, and temporarily was a war correspondent in southeast Europe, working from 1942 for Bavarian publishing director Wolf (Henry) Döring (1888 - 1958).

== Modernist techniques ==
After the war Fischer continued to exhibit and modernised his practice with graphic techniques including solarisation and Sabattier effects, bas-relief, contour printing, posterisation, and tone-dropout in both monochrome and colour printing.

== Recognition ==
Aside from his success in international photography salons, it was Fischer's older, more documentary picture that Edward Steichen chose in 1953 for the 1955 world-touring Museum of Modern Art exhibition that was seen by 9 million visitors The Family of Man. Window-light reveals a Tyrollean farmer family at their table eating their lunch from a cooking pan, while their child sups from his own bowl. The photo next appeared in 1954, with Tar worker and Street Atmosphere (with tram), in the Yearbook of the Photographic Society of Vienna 1953 - 1954. Steichen had come to Europe seeking photographs for the exhibition, but with few contacts in Austria he had to rely on a United States Information Service (USIS) officer based there, Yoichi Okamoto. The latter recruited Viennese gallery director, M. Gottschammel, of Verlag Die Galerie to collect and initially screen photographs sent by respondents to a 'call for participation' placed in newspapers and publicised widely in the photographic community in Austria. Fischer was one of five Austrian photographers who contributed work to The Family of Man, though because he had not met him, Steichen was not to know of Fischer's history of propaganda services to the Nazis and his police work for them during the war.

== Legacy ==
With Karl Piringer, Erich Körner and Emil Obrovsky, Fischer founded the Österreichische Gesellschaft für Photographie (ÖGPh) (Austrian Society for Photography) in 1955 to promote excellence in Austrian photography and to cultivate international contacts and connections in the photographic field. The Society continues today, with appointment to the ÖGPh granted by recommendation of two full members and limited to 65 in number.

== Exhibitions ==
=== Solo ===
- 1943: Vienna, "Photographs in Different Techniques, Especially in Bromoil Transfer ”, March 9, 1943
- 1947: Vienna, Department of Prints and Drawings: "Leopold Fischer: Silver bromide and bromoil prints", 10 June 1947
- 1952: Vienna, Department of Prints and Drawings: "Leopold Fischer: A collection of silver bromide enlargements", October 7, 1952
- 1956: Wien, Graphische Lehr- und Versuchsanstalt: “Leopold Fischer (Eine Kollektion Photographien)“, November 20, 1956
- 1957: Vienna, Department of Graphic Arts and Experimentation: "Leopold Fischer, EFIAP: A Collection Rolleiflex Images ", December 10, 1957
- 1963: Wien, Graphische Lehr- und Versuchsanstalt: “Leopold Fischer hon. EFIAP“, September 17, 1963
- 1964: Athens: “Austria Duo“, Mai 1964, veranstaltet von der Hellenic Photographic Society (beschickt von Leopold Fischer und Willy Hengl): u.a. “Sturm“, Solarisation

=== Group ===
- 1932: Vienna, Glaspalast, Burggarten: Second International Art Photography Exhibition of the Association of Austrian Amateur Photography Associations, June 5 - July 17, 1932 - prints: Evening Sun, Winter Night
- 1933:Vienna, Glaspalast, Burggarten: 5th Photographic Exhibition of the Association of Austrian Amateur Photographer Associations, June 4 - July 9, 1933 - print: Dachfeuer
- 1935: Vienna, Künstlerhaus: VI. Austrian Photographic Exhibition of the Association of Austrian Amateur Photography Associations, June 5 - July 4, 1935 - print: Venice, Gondola
- 1936: Vienna, Künstlerhaus: IV. International Photo Exhibition of the Association of Amateur Amateur Amateur Societies, May 23 - June 30, 1936 (675 exhibits, including 317 entrants from 30 countries) Section: Pictorial Photography: Study
- 1936 - 1937: Vienna: First photo exhibition of the photojournalist section of the Police Sports Association, December 12, 1936 - January 10, 1937, with special exhibition by Leopold Fischer and Johann Seidler: 140 Leica photographs Leafy Journey (children)
- 1937: Vienna: 7. Photographic exhibition of the Austria branch of the D.u.Ö.A.-V., February 21 - March 14, 1937
- 1938: Vienna, Künstlerhaus: “5th International Photo Congress Exhibition of the Association of Austrian Amateur Photography Associations ", May 28 - July 3, 1938 (540 exhibits from abroad and 241 from Germany and Austria): The Runaway, Aus dem Pustertal
- 1938: Vienna: 2nd Exhibition of the Photographic Section of the Vienna Police Sport Association, January 8 - February 7, 1938
- 1939: Munich: International Amateur Photographer Exhibition and Federal Exhibition of the Reich Association of German Amateur Photographers (IFA), July 29 -?, 1939 (around 850 exhibits from 31 nations): In the Suburbs
- 1941: Berlin, Künstlerhaus: Exhibition of the Reich Association of German Amateur Cinematography Associations, 8 November 1941 -?
- 1947 - 1948: Salzburg: "Master works of Austrian Amateur Photographers", November 1947, Graz, Thalia: "Master Works of Austrian Amateur Photographers and Special Exhibition of the Club of Amateur Photographers in Graz", Jan. 17 - February 1, 1948: 8 exhibits, 6 bromoils
- 1953: Linz: International Exhibition, 1953, organized by Kameraklub Linz-Urfahr (447 exhibits from 21 countries, including 82 members of the club): Sämann's Vision
- 1955: Austrian Society for Photography from 1955, founding member
- 1955: "The Family of Man", world-touring exhibition from the Museum of Modern Art, New York: Tyrolean Lunch.
- 1955: Wien: 1st International Salon, with the PSV's 15th Annual Exhibition, 1955, organized by the Photo Section of the Police Sports Association (415 exhibits, of which 112 were members of the Police Sports Association)
- 1983: "History of Photography in Austria", Vienna: Museum of the 20th Century, Dec. 8, 1983 - February 26, 1984; Graz: New Gallery at the Landesmuseum Joanneum and Künstlerhaus, March 16 - April 17, 1984; Linz: New Gallery of the City of Linz / Wolfgang Gurlitt Museum, May 3 - June 24, 1984; Klagenfurt: Gallery am Stadthaus and Künstlerhaus, 9 August - 16 Septeptember 1984; Salzburg: Museum Carolino Augusteum and Salzburger Kunstverein, 25 Sept. - 28 Oct. 1984; Innsbruck: Landesmuseum Ferdinandeum, 16 November - 31 December 1984, organized by the "Association for the Development of the History of Photography in Austria"

== Publications ==
=== Text in book, catalogue or periodical ===
- 1949 “Tontrennung und Bromölumdruck“ ('Posterisation and Bromoil'), in: Ratgeber für Photo- und Filmfreunde (Photographers' Guide'), 1st ed., 1949, Nr. 1–4, Wien: Rudolf Hans Hammer; vierteljährlich, Nr. 4, 14
- 1949 Bauer, Bäuerin ('Farmer and Farmer's Wife') in: Ratgeber für Photo- und Filmfreunde (Photographers' Guide'), 1st ed.., 1949, Nr. 1–4, Wien: Rudolf Hans Hammer; vierteljährlich, Nr. 4, 14
- 1954 L[eopold]. Fischer: "They understand each other [...]" (old woman with children), in: Österreichische Photo-Zeitung (Austrian Photo-Magazine) 1954, Vienna: ABZ print and Verlagsanstalt Hamann & Sinek; monthly, No. 9, 7
- 1964 "Controlled Solarization and Double Solarization", in: Österreichische Photo-Zeitung. Fachblatt für Lichtbildner und Photohändler (Journal for Photographers and Photographers), 13th ed., 1964, Vienna: ABZ-Druck- und Verlagsanstalt Hamann & Sinek; monthly, No. 8, 18-21

=== Photographs in publications ===
- 1930 Leop. Fischer: Graninger-Haus in Sievering, in: Radio Wien. Illustrierte Wochenschrift der österr. Radio Verkehrs-A.G.(Radio Vienna. Illustrated weekly paper of the Austrian Radio Verkehrs-A.G), 6th edition [No. 14 to 52, Jan. - Sept.], 7th ed. [No. 1 to 13, Sept. - Dec.], 1930, Vienna, No. 38, 3)
- 1933 Roof fire (fire brigade in action) (5th exhibition of the Association of Austrian Amateur Photographers Associations), in: Kamera Kunst. Illustrierte Zeitschrift für Photographie (Camera Art. Illustrated Magazine for Photography), Redigiert von Siegfried Wachtl, Mit der Beilage “Der Amateur-Kurbler“, 1931, Wien: Verlag der Kamera-Kunst; monthly, 220
- 1933 Wachauer Kinder beim Kirchgang, Leicavergrößerung ("Wachau children at church, Leica enlargement"), in: Photo- und Kino-Sport. Illustrierte Monatshefte für Amateure (Photo and Cinema Sport. Illustrated Monthly for Amateurs), 23. Jg., 1933, Wien: Herlango; monatlich, Sept., Beilage
- 1933 - 1940 In the Suburbs, in: Die Foto-Schau, 1939, Nov., 10; Die Galerie. Monatsblätter der internationalen Kunstphotographie, 8. Jg., 1940, Wien
- 1934 Peasants Plowing, in: Photo- und Kino-Sport. Illustrierte Monatshefte für Amateure, 24. Jg., 1934, Wien: Herlango; monatlich, 210: 1 illustration
- 1935 Kleinkinder ('Infants'), Leica-Aufnahmen, in: Photo- und Kino-Sport. Illustrierte Monatshefte für Amateure, 25. Jg., 1935, Wien: Herlango; monatlich, 86–87, 91 (with commentary): 6 illustrations.
- 1937 Leopold Franz Fischer: “Fahrt ins Gründe“ (children with cart), in: Photo- und Kino-Sport. Illustrierte Monatshefte für Amateure, 27. Jg., 1937, Wien: Herlango; monthly, Supplement to No. 1: 1 illustration
- 1939 various views, including. Fire brigade at exercise, stall at Naschmarkt, in: Das schöne Groß-Wien. Ein Bilderbuch von den Schönheiten des neuen Wien (Beautiful Greater Vienna. A picture book of the beauties of the new Vienna), Kurt Sommer, Wien: Deutscher Verlag für Jugend und Volk, o.J. (1939), [(2. Aufl.) 1941], 16: 7 illustrations
- 1941 Icy Alleyway, in: 'Die Galerie. Monatsblätter für die Kunstphotographie', 9. Jg., 1941, Wien; monatlich, Taf. 127, Aufnahmedaten und Kommentar, 95: 1 illustration.
- 1943 - 1945 “Aus der Ausstellung vom 9. März 1943“: Rising Thunderstorm, Bromoil Transfer, In Action, Homecoming (Woman with Shopping Bag), At the Bache (Woman with Child Fetching Water), in: 'Photographische Gesellschaft (Hg.): Jahrbuch der Photographischen Gesellschaft in Wien. 1943 - 1944 - 1945', Vienna: Department of Prints and Drawings, 1945; 20 pp., [2], 36 pl., Pl. 5–8, commentary, 20; with titles other than gravure, in: Photographic Correspondence, 1943, Supplements to Nos. 7–8, Commentary, 72: 4 illustrations
- 1948 Church in Old Krems, Motif from Spitz on the Danube, Thaw, Innsbruck (with horse-drawn carriage), in: Yearbook of the Photographic Society in Vienna 1947/48, ed. from the Photographic Society in Vienna, Vienna (Produced in the School of the State Graphic and Experimental Institute in Vienna), (1948), pl. 17–20, legends, 39: 4 illustrations.
- 1950 - 1983 Sämanns Vision (1950), combination of two negatives, in: Österreichische Photo-Zeitung, 1953, Vienna: ABZ-Druck- und Verlagsanstalt Hamann & Sinek; monthly, No. 6, 10; "Sämann's Vision No. 1", in: History of Photography in Austria, Volume 1, ed. from the Association for the Development of the History of Photography in Austria, Bad Ischl 1983, 505; Fótomüvészet, [19] 84/3, 10: 1 illustration.
- 1951 Reflection (Children by the Water), At lofty heights (Roofers), Walk in the Evening, Talwärts (Brook), in: 'Jahrbuch der Photographischen Gesellschaft in Wien 1950/51 (Yearbook of the Photographic Society in Vienna 1950/51), issued by the Photographischen Gesellschaft in Wien, Wien: o.V. (Hergestellt im Schulbetrieb der Staatlichen Graphischen Lehr- und Versuchsanstalt in Wien), (1951), o.S., Bildlegenden, 30: 4 illustrations.
- 1954 Tar worker, Street atmosphere (with tram), Farm, Tiroler Mittag" (family at lunch), in: Yearbook of the Photographic Society Vienna, ed. by the Photographic Society, 1953 - 1954, Wien: o.V (Hergestellt im Schulbetrieb der Staatlichen Graphischen Lehr- und Versuchsanstalt [Bundesanstalt], Wien (1954), o.S., zusätzliche Bildangaben, 32: 4 illustrations.
- 1956 Stormy winter, Descending fog, They understand each other (old woman and children), hay harvest (gravure), in: Yearbook of the Photographic Society Vienna, ed. from the Photographic Society, 1955 - 1956, Wien: o.V (Hergestellt im Schulbetrieb der Staatlichen Graphischen Lehr- und Versuchsanstalt [Bundesanstalt], Wien), Wien (1956), o.S.: 4 illustrations
- 1958 Mats, Operation (gendarmerie), Old roofs, Construction site, A secret" (children), In Italy (both gravure), in: Yearbook of the Photographic Society Vienna, ed. from the Photographic Society, 1957 - 1958, Wien: o.V (Hergestellt im Schulbetrieb der Staatlichen Graphischen Lehr- und Versuchsanstalt [Bundesanstalt], Wien), Wien (1958), o.S., zusätzliche Bildangaben, 41: 6 illustrations
- 1959 Old roofs, solarization, in: International Photo Almanac 1959: A cross section through the photographic work of our time, ed. by Robert Hetz, Mannheim: Fotopost-Verlag Bernhard Meisser, o.J., 124, Saten zu Aufnahme und Ausarbeitung, 204: 1 illustration.
- 1962 Storm (Solarisation), in: International Photo Almanac 1962 . . A cross section through the photographic work of our time, ed. by Robert Hetz, Düsseldorf: Karl Knapp, o.J. (1962), 105, Aufhamedaten, 192: 1 Illustration
- 1963 Winter Silhouette (passers-by), combination printing from original negative and a contour extract, in: International Photo Almanac 1963 international: A cross section through the photographic work of our time, editor Robert Hetz, Düsseldorf: Karl Knapp, o.J. (1963), 70, Aufnahmedaten, 191; Österreichische Photo-Zeitung. Fachblatt für Lichtbildner und Photohändler, 12. Jg., 1963, Wien: ABZ-Druck- und Verlagsanstalt Hamann & Sinek; monatlich, Nr. 4, 9, Kommentar Josef Drausinger, 13: 1 Illustration
- 1964 Storm, Solarization, with shooting data, in: Austrian Photo-Zeitung. Journal for Photographers and Photographers, 13th ed., 1964, Vienna: ABZ-Druck- und Verlagsanstalt Hamann & Sinek; monthly, No. 4, 18, Karussel, with recording data, in: ibid., No. 7, 12, comment Josef Drausinger, 15–16, "Development of a pseudo-solarization" (4), solarization, in: ibid ., No. 8, 19–20, Corso III, in: ibid., No. 10, 10, commentary Josef Drausinger, 14: 9 Illustrations
- 1965 - 1977 Storm, c.1965, contour excerpt from double solarization, in: Petr Tausk, Die Geschichte der Fotografie im 20. Jahrhundert. Von der Kunstfotografie zum Bildjournalismus, Köln: DuMont, 1977 (DuMont Dokumente), 182: 1 Illustration
- 1965 “Solarisation“, in: Österreichische Photo-Zeitung. Fachblatt für Lichtbildner und Photohändler, 14. Jg., 1965, Wien: ABZ-Druck- und Verlagsanstalt Hamann & Sinek; monatlich, Nr. 11, 6: Solarisation,
