= Karl Heinrich Baumgärtner =

German physician and pathologist

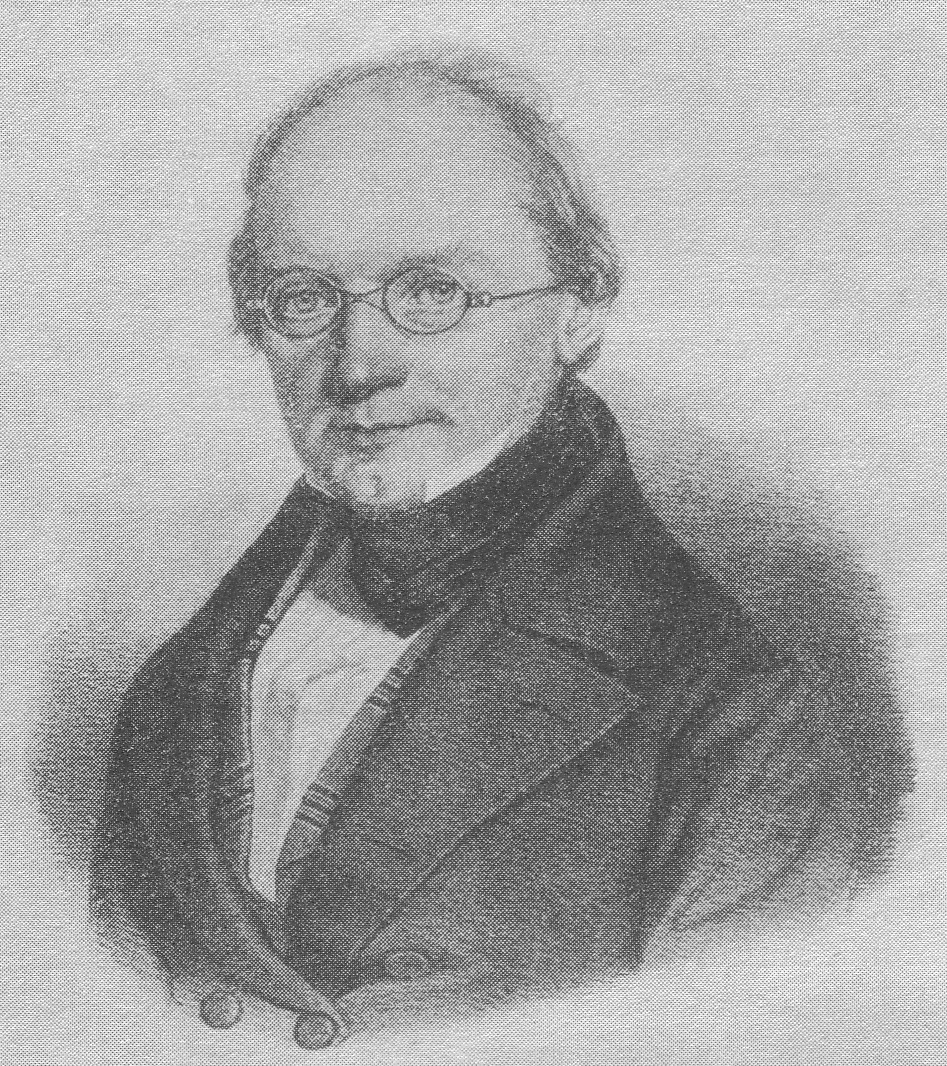
Karl Heinrich Baumgärtner

Karl Heinrich Baumgärtner (21 October 1798 in Pforzheim – 11 December 1886 in Baden-Baden) was a German medical doctor and pathologist.

He studied medicine at the Universities of Tübingen and Heidelberg, obtaining his medical degree in 1818. Following graduation, he attended to hospitals in Vienna and Berlin, and in 1820 was assigned as a regimental physician in Rastatt. In 1822 he was associated with an artillery brigade at Karlsruhe, and during the following year, he visited hospitals in Paris and London. From 1824 to 1862 he was a professor of clinical medicine at the University of Freiburg. During his career, he also served as a privy councilor to the Grand Duchy of Baden.

In the field of embryology, his Bildungskugeltheorie (1830) is considered to be a precursor to the cell theory proposed by Theodor Schwann.

== Selected published works ==
- Ueber die Natur und die Behandlung der Fieber, 1827 – On the nature and treatment of fever.
- Beobachtungen über die Nerven und das Blut in ihrem Gesunden und im krankhaften Zustande, 1830 – Observations on nerves and blood in healthy and morbid conditions.
- Handbuch der speciellen Krankheits- und Heilungslehre (2 volumes; 1842, 1847) – Manual of special illness and healing doctrines.
- Nähere Begründung der Lehre von der Embryonalanlage durch Keimspaltungen und den Polarisationen der organischen Körper, 1854 – A treatise involving embryo germination by divisions and polarizations of the organic body.
- Vermächtnisse eines Klinikers zur Feststellung zweckmäßiger Kurmethoden, 1862.
