= Wilhelm Lindenschmit the Younger =

German painter (1829–1895)

Ritter Wilhelm Lindenschmit the Younger
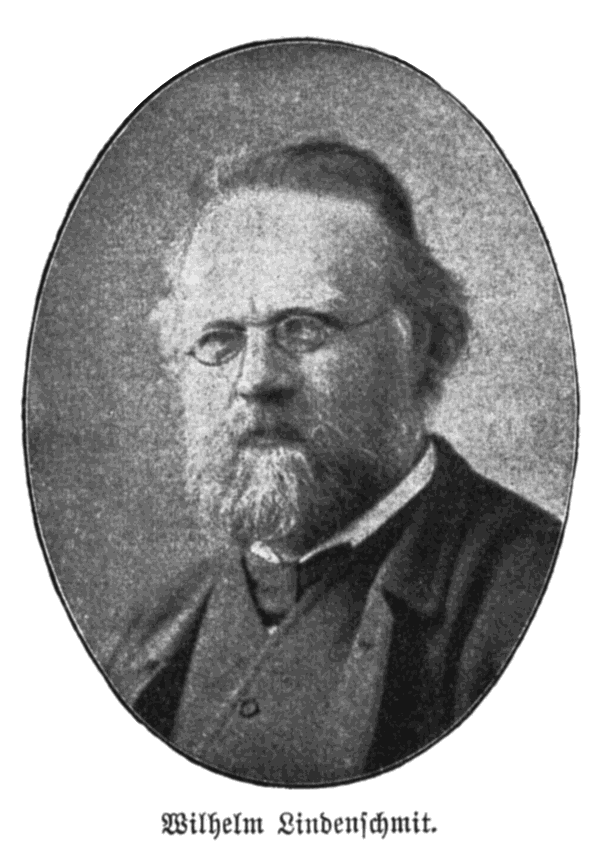
- Born: Wilhelmm Ludwig Lindenschmit; 20 June 1829; Munich, Kingdom of Bavaria
- Died: 8 June 1895 (aged 65); Munich, Kingdom of Bavaria, German Empire
- Education: Städel
- Movement: Munich school
- Father: Wilhelm Lindenschmit
- Relatives: Ludwig Lindenschmit (uncle)

Wilhelm Lindenschmit (the Younger) (June 20, 1829 – June 8, 1895) was a German history painter who was a native of Munich. He was the son of painter Wilhelm Lindenschmit the Elder (1806–1848).

== Biography ==
Lindenschmit studied art in Mainz with his uncle, Ludwig Lindenschmit (1809–1893), and afterwards studied at the Academy of Munich, at the Städel Institute in Frankfurt am Main, in Antwerp, and later in Paris, where he created Ernte and Herzog Alba bei der Gräfin von Rudolstadt (Duke of Alba with the Countess of Rudolstadt). These two paintings are now housed at the Kunsthalle Hamburg.

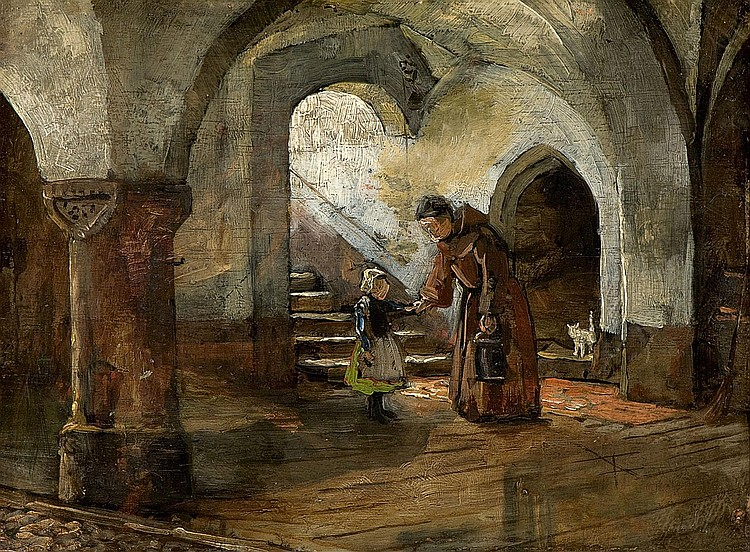
Klosterszene (1887)

From 1853 to 1863, Lindenschmit painted in Frankfurt, later relocating to Munich, where he eventually became a professor to the Academy (1875). During this period of time, he created paintings from the age of the Protestant Reformation as well as works on other subjects from roughly the same time frame.

- Stiftung des Jesuitenordens (Institution of the Order of Jesuits), 1868.
- Ulrich von Hutten im Kampf mit französischen Adligen (Ulrich von Hütten fighting French nobles), 1869.
- Luther und Kardinal Cajetan in Augsburg (Martin Luther and Cardinal Cajetan in Augsburg).
- Der junge Luther bei Andreas Proles (The young Luther with Andreas Proles), 1869.
- Knox und die schottischen Bilderstürmer (John Knox and the Scottish iconoclast).
- Die Ermordung Wilhelms von Oranien (The assassination of William of Orange), 1872.
- Sir Walter Raleigh im Tower von Verwandten besucht (Walter Raleigh in the Tower visited by relatives), 1873.

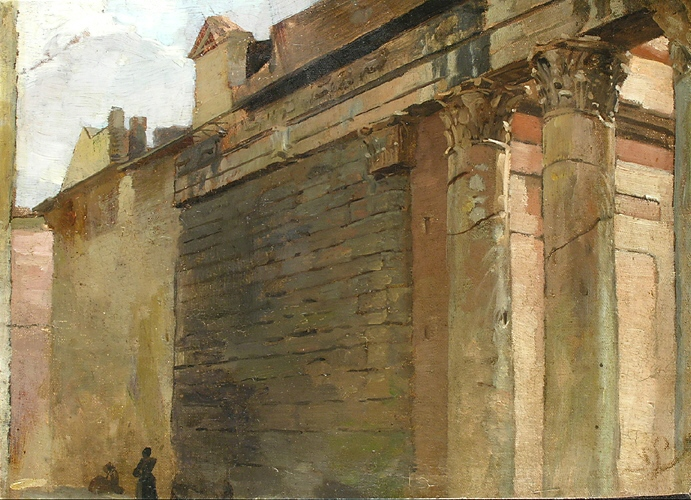
The Temple of Antoninus and Faustina in Rome

Beginning in the mid-1870s, Lindenschmit's works gradually became more luminous in color, being associated with the modern Munich school of painting. A few of these paintings include:

- Narziß (Narcissus).
- Einzug Alarichs in Rom (Entry of Alaric into Rome).
- Venus an der Leiche des Adonis (Venus by the body of Adonis); on display at the Neue Pinakothek in Munich.
