= Wilhelm Lindenschmit the Elder =

German painter

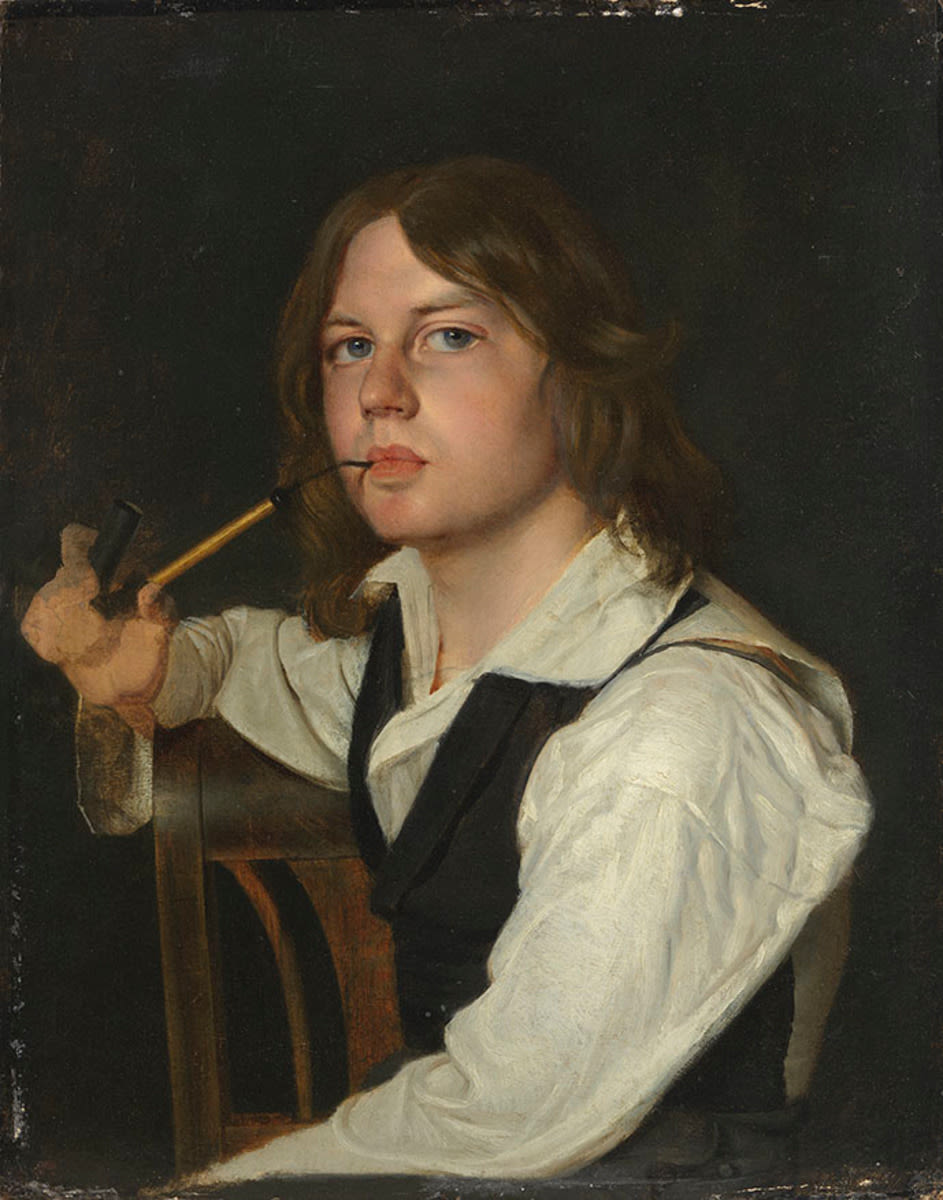
- Selbstbildnis mit Pfeife (transl. Self-portrait with a pipe), c. 1825-7. From the collections of the Neue Pinakothek
- Born: 9 March 1806; Mayence, Mont-Tonnerre, First French Empire
- Died: 12 March 1848 (aged 42); Mainz, Grand Duchy of Hesse
- Education: Royal Academy of Fine Arts
- Alma mater: Imperial and Royal Unified Academy of Fine Arts
- Style: History painting
- Children: Wilhelm Lindenschmit
- Relatives: Ludwig Lindenschmit (brother)

Wilhelm Lindenschmit (the Elder) (9 March 1806 – 12 March 1848) was a German history painter born in Mayence. He was an older brother to prehistorian Ludwig Lindenschmit (1809–1893), and father to history painter Wilhelm Lindenschmit (1829–1895).

== Biography ==
Lindenschmidt studied art in the academies in Munich and Vienna, returning to Munich in 1826 as an assistant to Peter von Cornelius (1783–1867). Here, he painted Sieg Ludwigs des Reichen über Albrecht Achilles von Brandenburg bei Giengen an der Brenz (Victory of Ludwig over Albrecht Achilles of Brandenburg at Giengen an der Brenz) in the arcades of the Hofgarten, as well as Leben des Leonardo da Vinci (Life of Leonardo da Vinci) on the loggia at Alte Pinakothek. Afterwards, he performed a series of frescos at the Castle of Hohenschwangau.

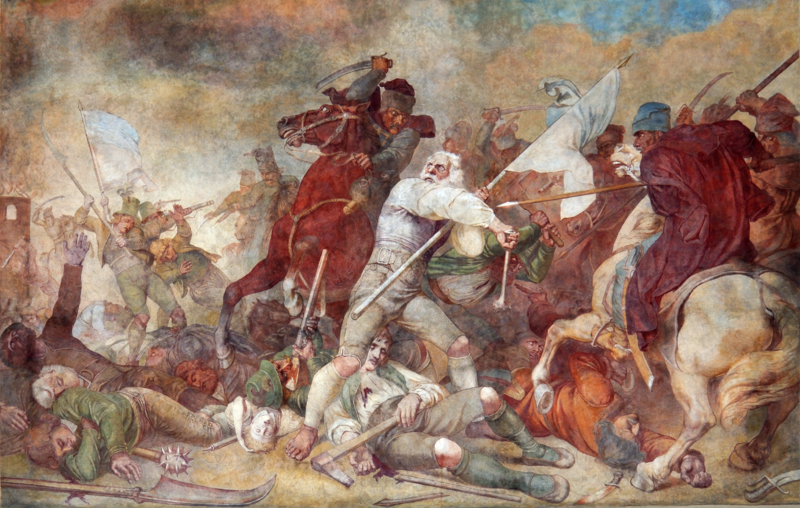
Sendlinger Mordweihnacht (Sendling's Night of Murder) by Lindenschmit

In 1830 he finished work on the fresco Die Bauernschlacht von Sendling 1705 (The Farmer's Battle of Sendling 1705) on the outer wall of the old parish church of St. Margaret in Sendling. Later in his career, he painted a series of frescos at the ducal castle of Lantlsberg in regards to the history of the House of Wettin.

He also painted in oils, several of which are presently located at galleries in Karlsruhe, Munich, Mainz and Leipzig. These works include Schlacht des Arminius (Battle of Arminius) and Einzug Ottos des Großen in das befreite Augsburg am Abend nach dem Sieg auf dem Lechfeld (Entry of Otto the Great into Augsburg after victory at Lechfeld). In 1848 he was commissioned as court painter at Meiningen, but died soon afterwards at the age of 42.
