= Friedrich August Benjamin Puchelt =

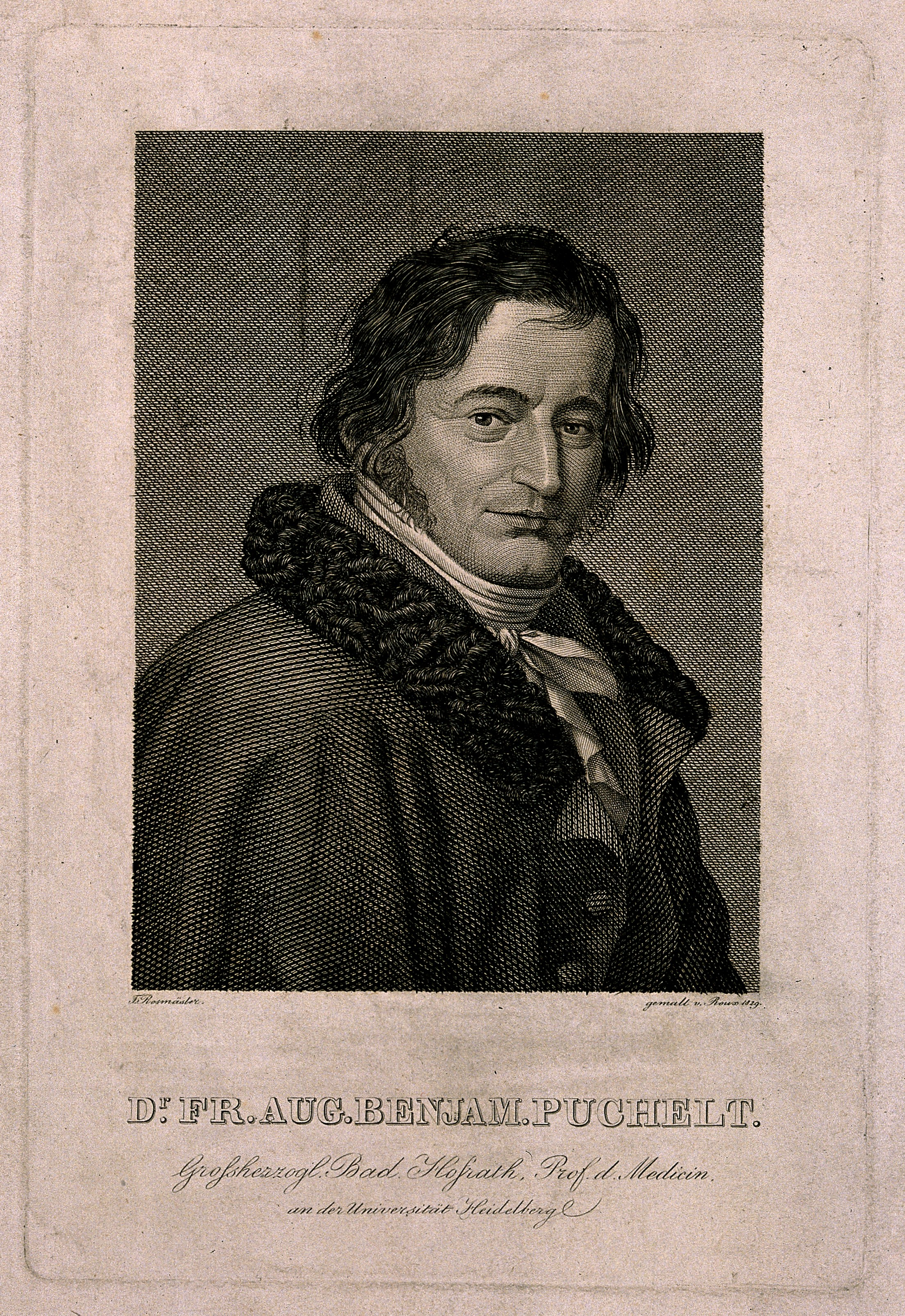
- Born: 27 April 1784; Bornsdorf, Kingdom of Prussia, Holy Roman Empire
- Died: 2 June 1845 (aged 61); Heidelberg, Kingdom of Prussia
- Medical career
- Profession: Doctor
- Field: Pathology
- Institutions: Leipzig University; Heidelberg University

Friedrich August Benjamin Puchelt (27 April 1784, Bornsdorf near Luckau – 2 June 1845, Heidelberg) was a German pathologist remembered for coining the term "perityphlitis" to describe inflammation of the right iliac fossa in 1832.

From 1804 to 1808, he studied medicine at the University of Leipzig, where from 1815, he served as an associate professor of pathology and therapy. In 1820 he attained a full professorship, relocating to Heidelberg in 1824 as a professor of pathology and as director of its polyclinic. During the same year, he was appointed court councillor to the Grand Duchy of Baden. He served as university rector at Heidelberg two separate times: for the 1838 – 1839 and 1850 – 1851 terms.

== Published works ==
He provided continued editorship of Johann Samuel Ersch's "Literatur der Medicin seit der Mitte des achtzehnten Jahrhunderts bis auf die neueste Zeit" (Literature of medicine since the middle of the eighteenth century up to recent times). From 1825 onward, he was co-editor of "Heidelberger klinischen Annalen". Other principal written efforts by Puchelt include:

- Das Venensystem in seinen krankhaften Verhältnissen, Leipzig 1818 – The venous system in its morbid conditions.
- Über die Homöopathie, Berlin 1820 – About homeopathy.
- Beiträge zur Medicin als Wissenschaft und Kunst, Leipzig 1823 – Contributions to medicine as a science and art.
- Das System der Medicin in Umrissen dargestellt, 5 volumes, Heidelberg 1826-35 – The present system of medicine in outline.
- Die Hautkrankheiten in tabellarischer Form, Heidelberg 1836.– Table of skin diseases.
