= Carotid groove =

Groove in the sphenoid bone

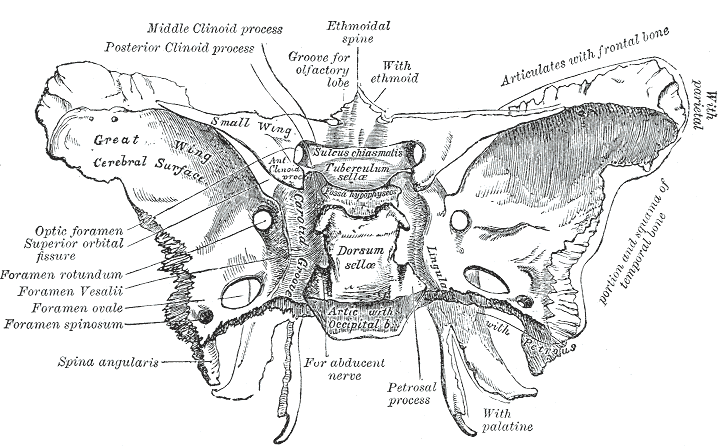
- Sphenoid bone. Upper surface. (Carotid groove visible at left center.)

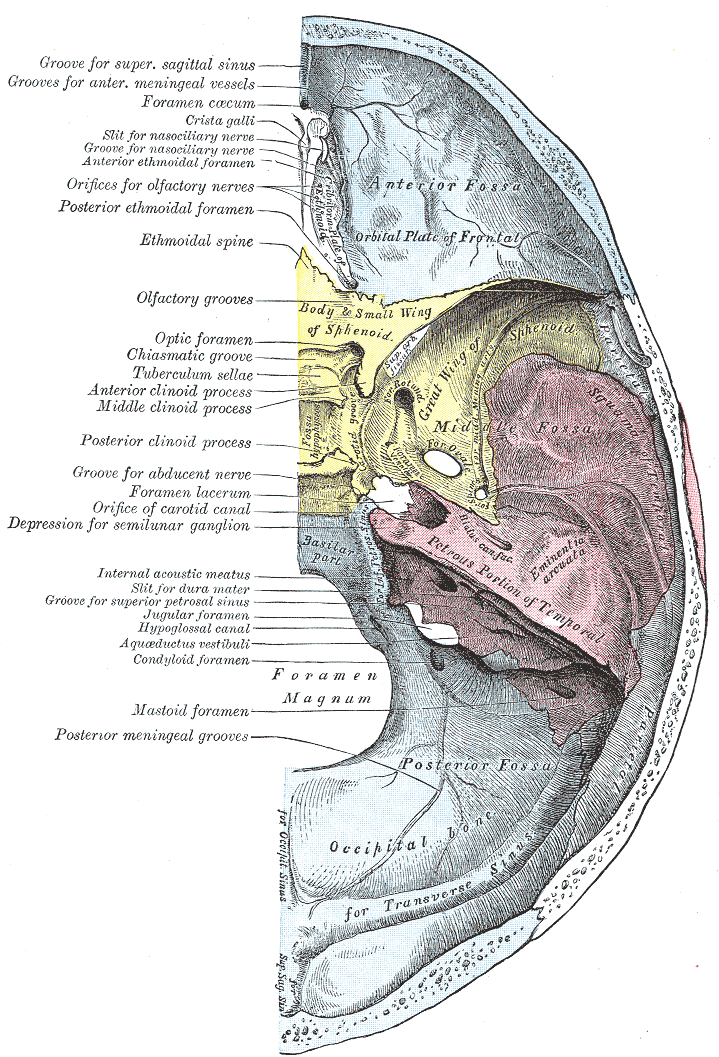
- Base of the skull. Upper surface. (Sphenoid bone is in yellow, and carotid groove is labeled at center of sphenoid.

Details
- Location: Sphenoid bone

Identifiers
- Latin: sulcus caroticus ossis sphenoidalis
- TA98: A02.1.05.012
- TA2: 596
- FMA: 54753

The carotid groove is an anatomical groove in the sphenoid bone located above the attachment of each great wing of the sphenoid bone. The groove is curved like the italic letter f, and lodges the internal carotid artery and the cavernous sinus.
