= Mastoid foramen =

Hole in the back of the temporal bone

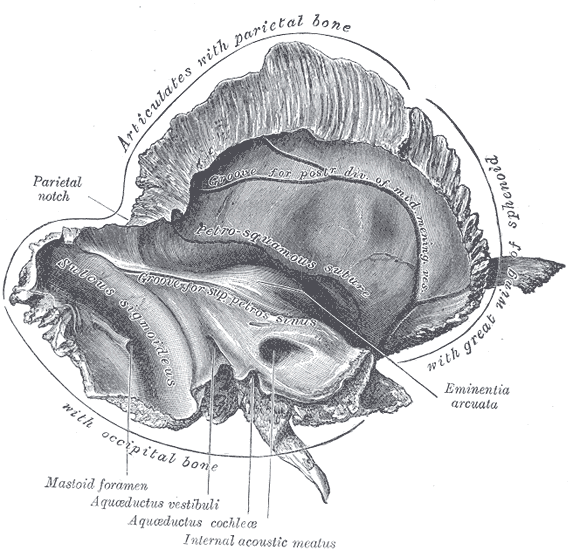
- Left temporal bone. Inner surface. (Mastoid foramen labeled at bottom left.)

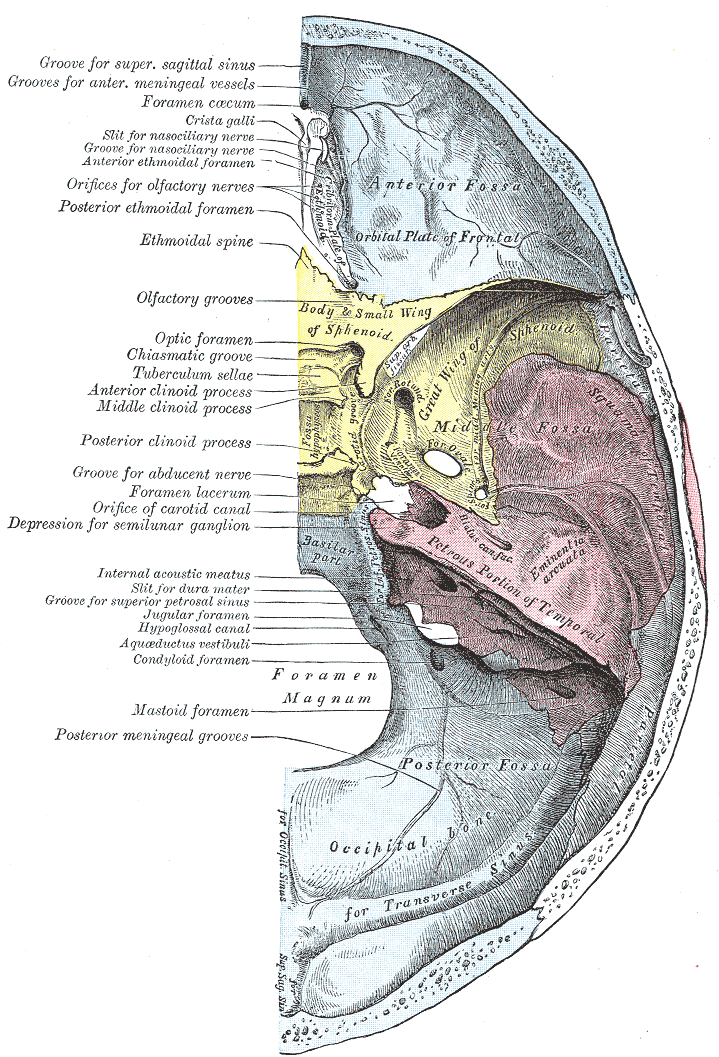
- Base of the skull. Upper surface. (Temporal bone is pink, and label for mastoid foramen is at left, second from the bottom.)

Details
- Part of: Temporal bone of skull
- System: Skeletal

Identifiers
- Latin: foramen mastoideum
- TA98: A02.1.06.008
- TA2: 649
- FMA: 53159

The mastoid foramen is a hole in the posterior border of the temporal bone. It transmits an emissary vein between the sigmoid sinus and the suboccipital venous plexus, and a small branch of the occipital artery, the posterior meningeal artery to the dura mater.

== Structure ==
The mastoid foramen is a hole in the posterior border of the temporal bone of the skull.

The opening of the mastoid foramen is an average of 18 mm from the asterion, and around 34 mm from the external auditory meatus. It is typically very narrow. This may be around 2 mm.

=== Variation ===
The position and size of this foramen are very variable. It is not always present. Sometimes, it is duplicated on one side or both sides. Sometimes, it is situated in the occipital bone, or in the suture between the temporal bone and the occipital bone.

== Function ==
The mastoid foramen transmits:

- An emissary vein between the sigmoid sinus and the suboccipital venous plexus or the posterior auricular vein.
- A small branch of the occipital artery, the posterior meningeal artery, to the dura mater.
