= Colombischlössle Archeological Museum =

Museum in Freiburg im Breisgau, Germany

Coordinates: 47°59′52″N 7°50′46″E

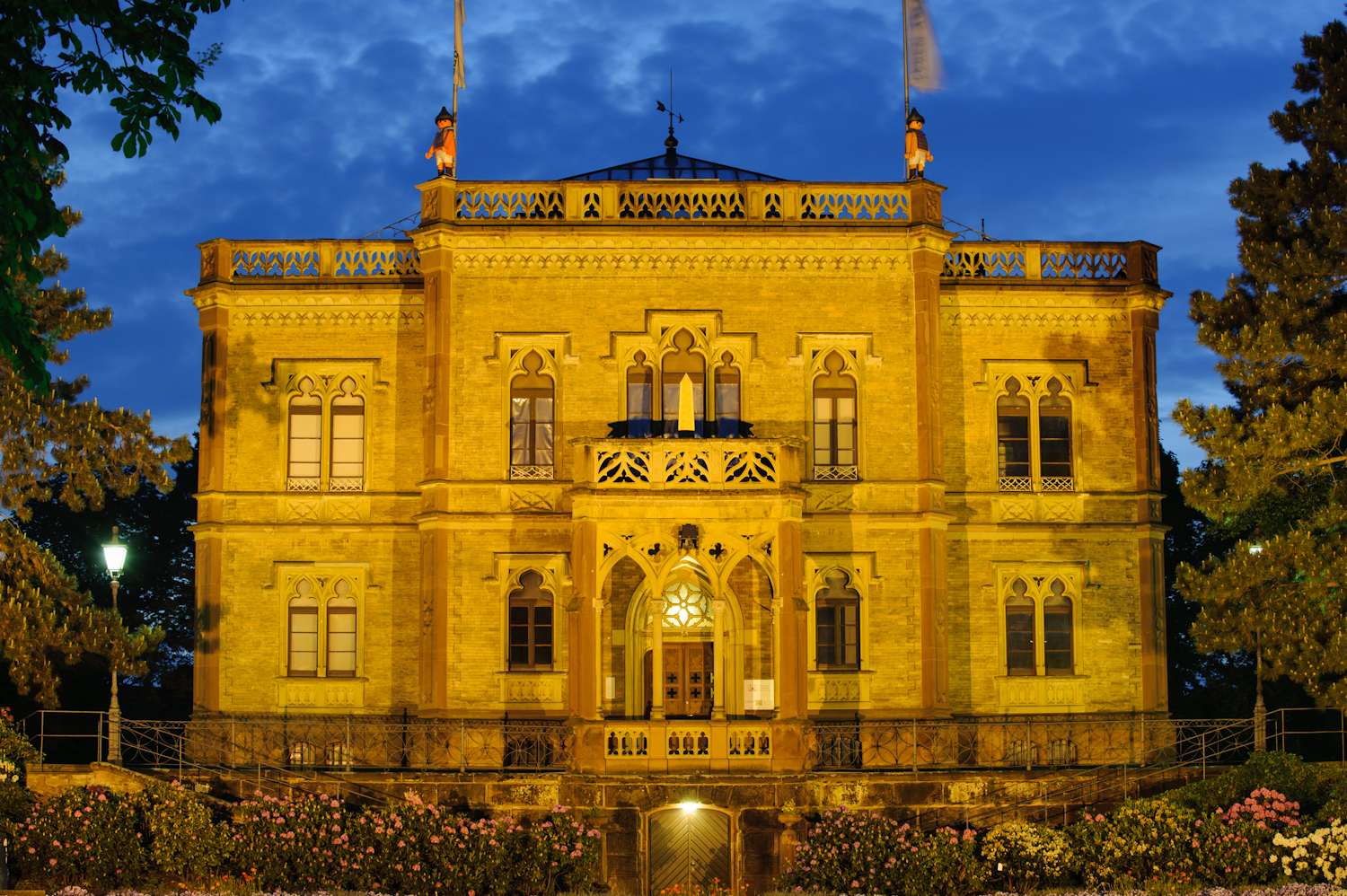
Colombischlössle Museum

Colombischlössle Archeological Museum, Freiburg

The Colombischlössle Archeological Museum is a museum in Freiburg im Breisgau in southwest Germany which features the prehistoric inheritance of the High and Upper Rhine. It was founded as the Museum of Prehistory and Early History in 1983. The focus of the museum is on the human development of the High and upper Rhine from the Paleolithic Age to the Early Middle Ages.

== See also ==
- Colombischlössle Freiburg
