= Nankali's Masticatory Force Systematization =

Nankali’s masticatory force systematization categorizes the locations of the forces on different part of mandible/maxilla, which are important in designing a prosthetic and implant treatment in dentistry.

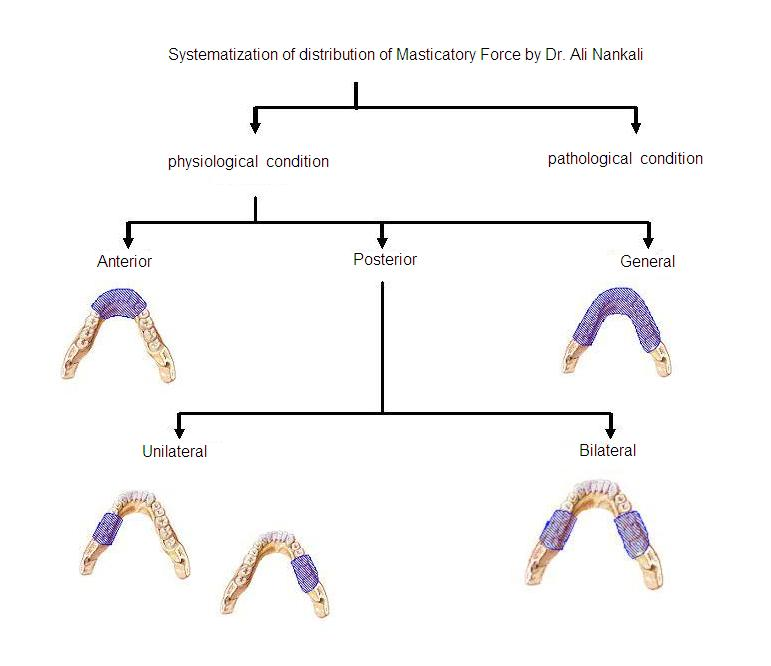
The systematization of masticatory force distribution was designed by Dr. Ali Nankali.

== Masticatory muscles ==
The muscles of mastication or masticatory muscles are:

a) masseter,
b) temporalis,
c) medial pterygoid,
d) superior belly of the lateral pterygoid,
e) anterior digastrics,
f) geniohyoid,
g) mylohyoid
h) inferior belly of the lateral pterygoid.

== Measuring masticatory force ==
The masticatory force initially was measured by Dr. Bleck. Bleck used a gnathodynamometer and also found out the close relation between periodontal tissue and masticatory force.

Dr. Ali Nankali research - masticatory force

Dr. Morill worked more deeply on the relationship between masticatory muscles and pain signals from the periodontal tissue in different ways.

Dr. Shreder, using local anaesthesia (to ignore the periodontal response) measured the maximum possible force of the masticatory system and discovered the differences in the produced force, which was approximately doubled.

The periodontal system controls automatically the measure of mastication force in this process and the jaw elevator muscles develop the main forces used in mastication.

Dr. Weber worked out that 1 cm^{2} cross section surface area of any masticatory muscle can produce approximately 10 kg force. The following average surfaces were found: temporalis - 8 cm^{2}, masseter - 7.5 cm^{2}, and medial pterygoid - 4 cm^{2} which makes a total of 19.5cm^{2}. However, this force in some people is measured up to 3900N in combination.

The force generated during routine mastication like having carrots or meat is about 70-150N although in some people with specific conditions it may reach up to 500-700N.;

Dr. Ali Nankali continued the masticatory force study and observed a number of mastication acts by individuals using computer. The monitored results of this investigation illustrated constant changes in the amount of masticatory force during mastication due to the characteristic and size of the mouthful.

He also studied the relation between mechanical and bio-physiological movements of the masticatory system which shows that creating the masticatory force is directly depended to the surface area and its orientation and therefore he suggested the masticatory force systematization.

According to this systematization, the masticatory force is divided in two main groups, physiological and pathological groups. The physiological masticatory force by itself is divided into three subgroups according to their localizations, anterior, general (covering the entire arch) and posterior section of the arch. The posterior group is also divided into two other groups; unilateral and bilateral.

This systematization proves that the condition of producing a maximum masticatory force by a person is using the general subgroup of this systematization.

== History ==
The systematization of the masticatory force distribution was designed by Nankali in the National Medical University at the orthopedic and implant stomatology department, which was verified (October 1999) by the Scientific Board of National Medical University (O.O. Bogomolets) and international patent organization (УДК; 616.314-76-77:616.314.11-74:678.029.46:612.311) in Kiev.

This systematization was presented for the first time at the 55th Medical Science Conference of Students & Young Scientists in 2000, organized by the Ukraine Health Ministry and the National Medical University known as O.O. Bogomolets, and Society Science Students known as O.O. Kisilia. The result of presentation in "Young Scientists and Students / Scientific Medical Seminar in 1999" was published.
