= Masticatory force =

Force of chewing

Masticatory force or force of mastication is the force created by the dynamic action of the masticatory muscles during the act of chewing.

== Masticatory muscles ==
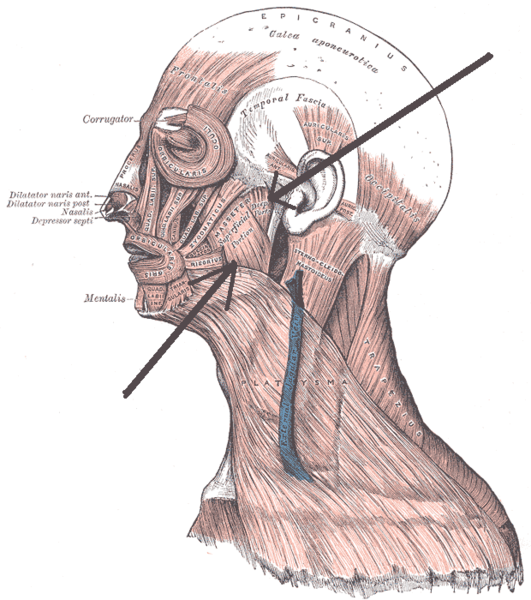
Muscles of the head, face, and neck.

The muscles that power the jaw movements during chewing are known as the muscles of mastication or masticatory muscles, and are functionally classified as:

- Jaw elevators: the masseter, temporalis, medial pterygoid and superior belly of the lateral pterygoid
- Jaw depressors; the anterior digastrics, geniohyoid, mylohyoid and inferior belly of the lateral pterygoid

== Measuring masticatory force ==
The first device for measuring masticatory force (gnathodynamometer) was created by Black in 1893. He determined that periodontal tissue is an important issue, which impacts the amount of force. Morill found out that masticatory muscles stop their contraction differently upon the appearance of pain signals from the periodontal tissue.

Shreder used local anaesthesia to ignore the periodontal response to measure the maximum force of mastication. His research showed that a 21-year-old man without any periodontal pathology who could produce approximately 35 kilograms-force (340 N) of force, increased the amount of that force to 60 kilograms-force (590 N) following local anaesthesia.

Weber worked out that 1 cm^{2} surface of perpendicular slide of any masticatory muscle can produce approximately 10 kilograms-force (100 N) force. The following surfaces were found

- temporalis – 8 cm^{2}
- masseter – 7.5 cm^{2}
- medial pterygoid – 4 cm^{2}

Thus, the total average surface area of perpendicular masticatory muscles slide is about 19.5 square centimetres (3.02 in^{2}).

== Forces ==
Nankali studied chewing in multiple individuals. He found variation in the amount of masticatory force.

The masticatory forces changes at eating time according to mouthful characteristic and size. This has various effects on the maxilla and mandible via the teeth. The periodontal system automatically controls the measure of mastication force. The jaw elevator muscles develop the main forces used in mastication.

The force generated during routine mastication of food such as carrots or meat is about 70 to 150 newtons (16 to 34 lbf). The maximum masticatory force in some people may reach up to 500 to 700 newtons (110 to 160 lbf).

The study of masticatory force in patients with polymyositis and dermatomyositis shows that hyposalivation and mucosal alterations can be related to the pathology of masticatory system.

== Force distribution ==
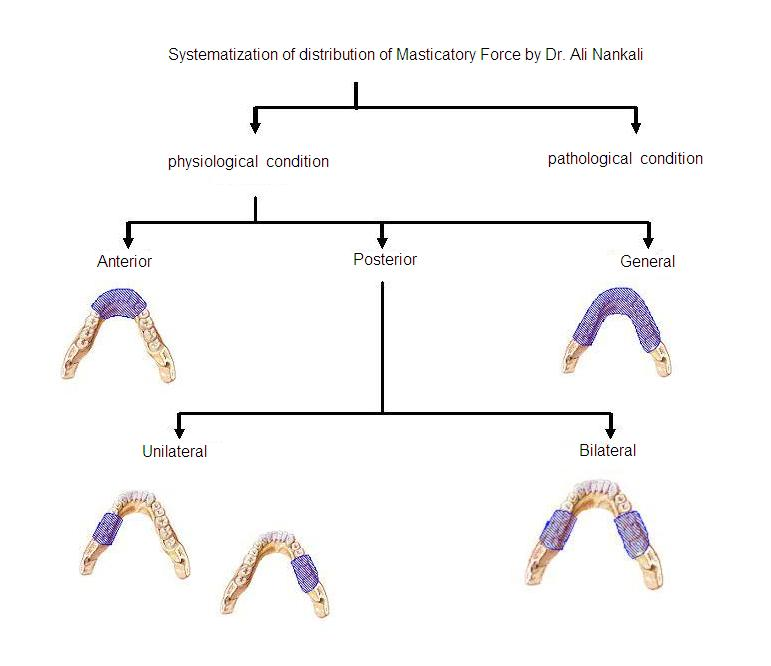
The systematization of masticatory force distribution was designed by Ali Nankali.

Nankali systematized masticatory force distribution. According to this system, force is divided in two main groups, with physiological or pathological conditions. The physiological masticatory force is divided into three subgroups according to their localizations: anterior, general (covering the entire arch) and posterior part of arch, which is also divided into two different groups; unilateral and bilateral.

Producing a maximum masticatory force uses the general subgroup of this systematization.
