= External pterygoid =

External pterygoid can refer to:

- Lateral pterygoid muscle (external pterygoid muscle)
- Lateral pterygoid nerve (external pterygoid nerve)
- Marcus Gunn phenomenon (external pterygoid-levator synkinesis)
