= Dislocation of jaw =

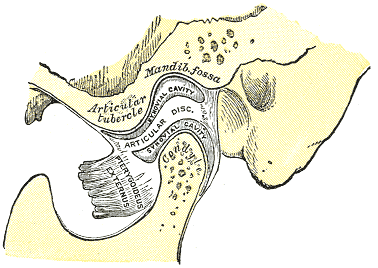
- Sagittal section of the articulation of the mandible.
- Specialty: Emergency medicine, oral and maxillofacial surgery

Dislocations occur when two bones that originally met at the joint detach. Dislocations should not be confused with subluxation. Subluxation is when the joint is still partially attached to the bone.

When a person has a dislocated jaw it is difficult to open and close the mouth. Dislocation can occur following a series of events if the jaw locks while open or unable to close. If the jaw is dislocated, it may cause an extreme headache or inability to concentrate. When the muscle's alignment is out of sync, a pain will occur due to unwanted rotation of the jaw.

If the pain remains constant, it may require surgery to realign the jaw. Depending on the severity of the jaw's dislocation, pain relief such as paracetamol may assist to alleviate the initial chronic pain. If the pain relief is taken for an extended period of time, it may negatively affect the person while talking, eating, drinking, etc.

== Symptoms ==
The symptoms can be numerous depending on the severity of the dislocation injury and how long the person is inflicted with the injury. Symptoms of a dislocated jaw include a bite that feels “off” or abnormal, difficulty talking or moving jaw, not able to close mouth completely, drooling due to not being able to shut mouth completely, teeth feel they are out of alignment, and excruciating pain

The immediate symptom can be a loud crunch noise occurring right up against the eardrum. This is instantly followed by excruciating pain, particularly in the side where the dislocation occurred.

Short-term symptoms can range from mild to chronic headaches, muscle tension or pain in the face, jaw and neck.

Long-term symptoms can result in sleep deprivation, tiredness/lethargy, frustration, bursts of anger or short fuse, difficulty performing everyday tasks, depression, social issues relating to difficulty talking, hearing sensitivity (particularly to high pitched sounds), tinnitus and pain when seated associated with posture while at a computer and reading books from general pressure on the jaw and facial muscles when tilting head down or up. And possible causing subsequent facial asymmetry.

In contrast, symptoms of a fractured jaw include bleeding coming from the mouth, unable to open the mouth wide without pain, bruising and swelling of the face, difficulty eating due to the constant pain, loss of feeling in the face (more specifically the lower lip) and lacks full range of motion of the jaw.

== Anatomy ==
The joint involved with jaw dislocation is the temporomandibular joint (TMJ). This joint is located where the mandibular condyles and the temporal bone meet. Membranes that surround the bones help during the hinging and gliding of jaw movement. For the mouth to close it requires the following muscles: the masseter, temporalis, and medial pterygoid muscle. For the jaw to open it requires the lateral pterygoid muscle.

== Pathophysiology ==
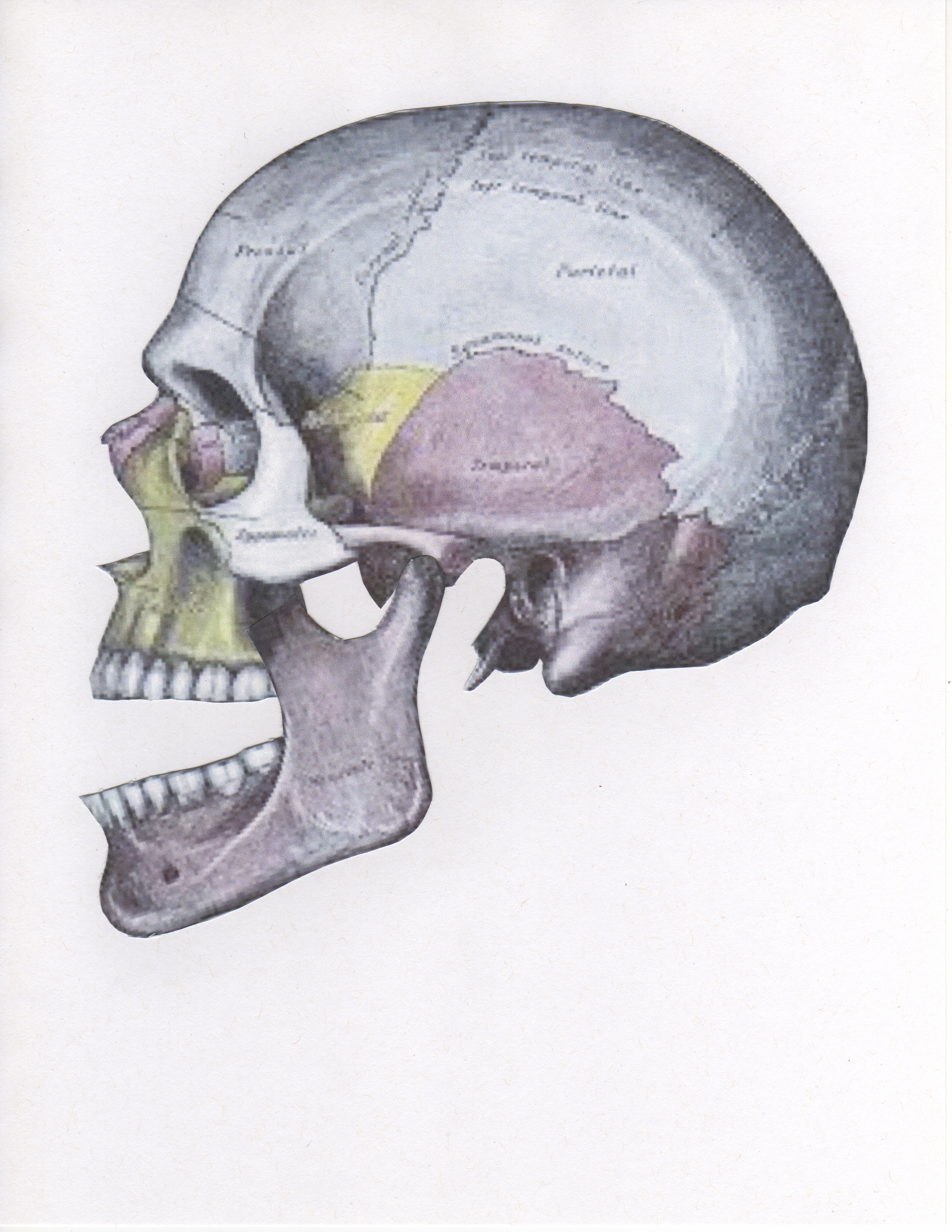
Side view of the skull with anterior dislocation of jaw.

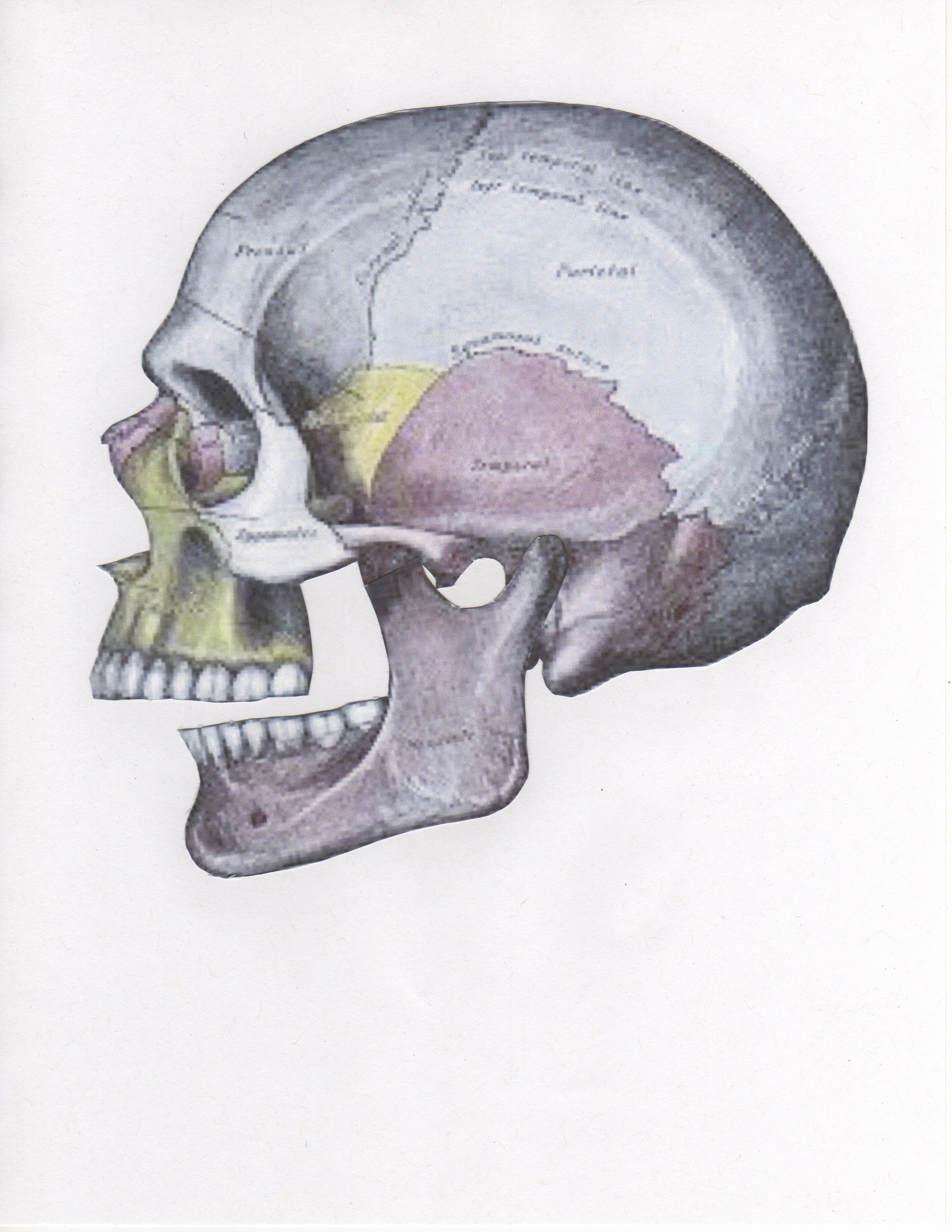
Side view of the skull with posterior dislocation of jaw.

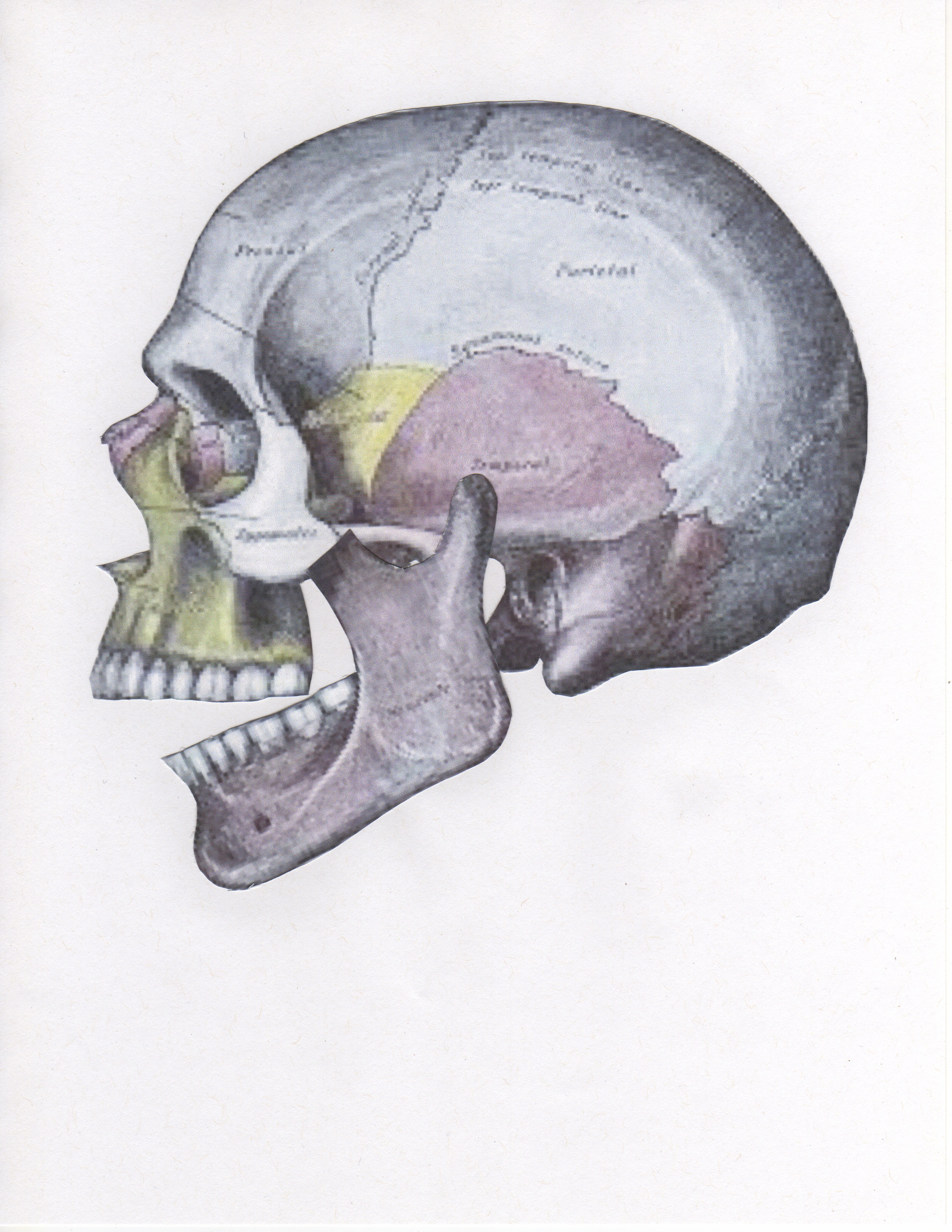
Side view of the skull with superior dislocation of jaw.

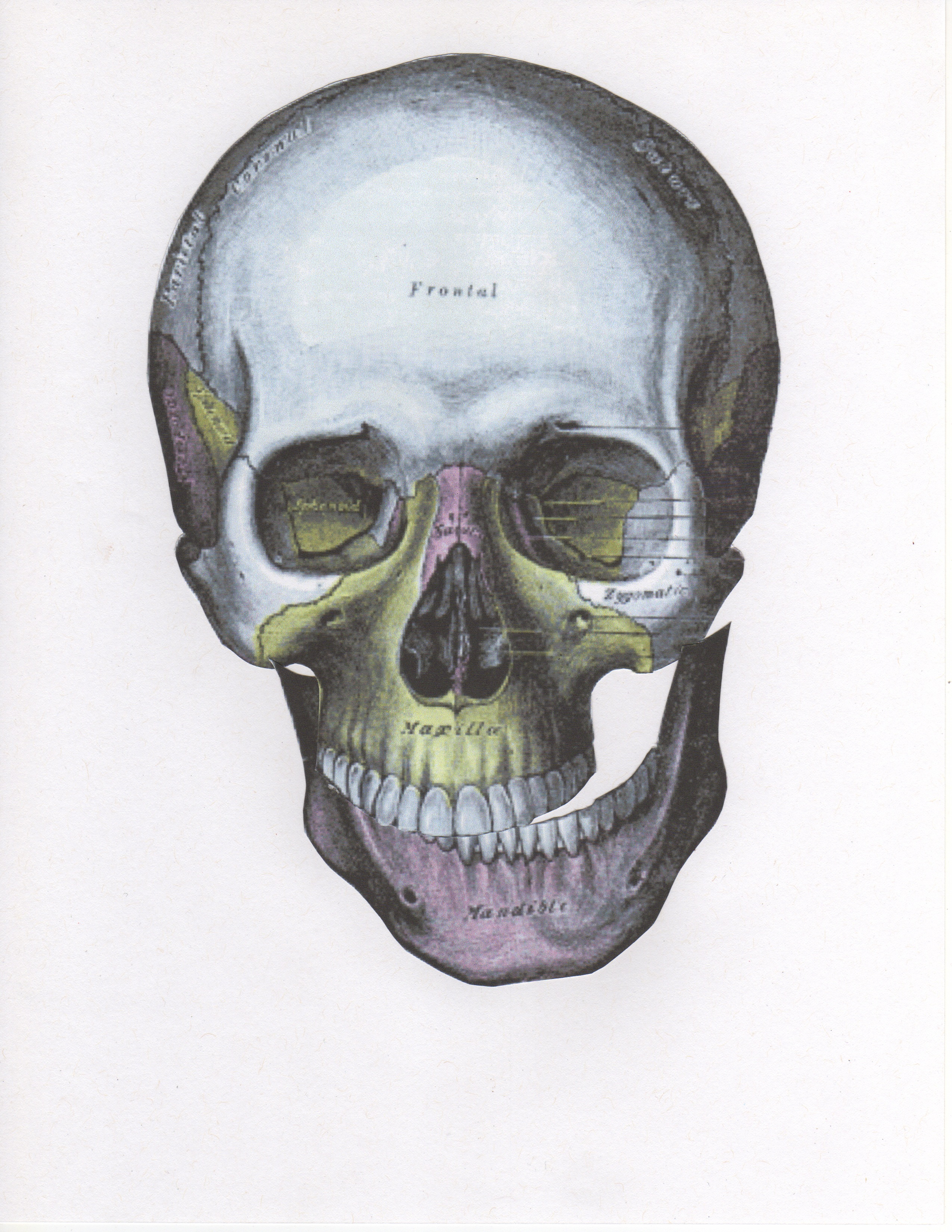
Front view of the skull with lateral dislocation of jaw.

There are four different positions of jaw dislocation: posterior, anterior, superior and lateral. The most common position is anterior, while the other types are rare. Anterior dislocation shifts the lower jaw forward if the mouth excessively opens. This type of dislocation may happen bilaterally or unilaterally after yawning. The muscles that are affected during anterior jaw dislocation are the masseter and temporalis which pull up on the mandible and the lateral pterygoid which relaxes the mandibular condyle. The condyle can become locked in front of the articular eminence. Posterior dislocation is possible for people who are injured by being punched in the chin. This dislocation will push the jaw back affecting the alignment of the mandibular condyle and mastoid. The external auditory canal may be fractured. Superior dislocations occur after being punched below the mandibular ramus as the mouth remains half-open. Since great force occurs in a punch, the angle of the jaw will be forced upward moving towards the condylar head. This can result in a fracture of the glenoid fossa and displacement of the condyle into the middle cranial fossa, potentially injuring the facial and vestibulocochlear nerves and the temporal lobe. Lateral dislocations move the mandibular condyle away from the skull and are likely to happen together with jaw fractures.

Posterior, superior and lateral dislocations are uncommon injuries and usually result from high-energy trauma to the chin. By contrast, anterior dislocations are more often the result of low-energy trauma (e.g. tooth extraction) or secondary to a medical condition that affects the stability of the joint (e.g. seizures, ligamentous laxity, degeneration of joint capsule).

== Diagnosis ==
As with other joint dislocations, clinical history and examination are crucial for diagnosis of a jaw dislocation. Commonly, plain and panoramic X-ray radiographies are used to determine the relative position of the mandibular condyle. If a complex or unusual injury is suspected, three-dimensional computed tomography is most reliable in diagnosing dislocation and possibly associated fractures or soft tissue injuries.

In case of dislocations resulting from high-energy trauma, attention must also be paid to possible other injuries, particularly blunt or indirect trauma to the skull and cervical spine. Acutely life-threatening conditions need to be ruled out or treated in first line. For superior jaw dislocation in particular, serious intracranial complications such as epidural hematoma are possible and must be recognized and managed to prevent disability or even death. Therefore, neurological status has to be examined in patients with complex dislocations involving temporal bone fractures. Hearing deficits on the injured side may indicate damage to structures of the ear.

== Treatment ==
As with most dislocated joints, a dislocated jaw can usually be successfully positioned into its normal position by a trained medical professional. Attempts to readjust the jaw without the assistance of a medical professional could result in worsening of the injury. The health care provider may be able to set it back into the correct position by manipulating the area back into its proper position. Numbing medications such as general anesthetics, muscle relaxants, or in some cases sedation, may be needed to relax the strong jaw muscle. In more severe cases, surgery may be needed to reposition the jaw, particularly if repeated jaw dislocations have occurred.

== Epidemiology ==
Jaw dislocation is common for people who are in car, motorcycle or related accidents and also sports related activities. This injury does not pin point specific ages or genders because it could happen to anybody. People who dislocate their jaw do not usually seek emergency medical care. In most cases, jaw dislocations are acute and can be altered by minor manipulations. It was reported from one study that over a seven-year period at an emergency medical site, with 100,000 yearly visits, there were only 37 patients that were seen for a dislocated jaw.

== See also ==
- Curb stomp
