= Caroticotympanic =

Caroticotympanic may refer to:

- Caroticotympanic arteries
- Caroticotympanic nerves
