= Articular disk of the temporomandibular joint =

Fibrous plate between jawbone and skull

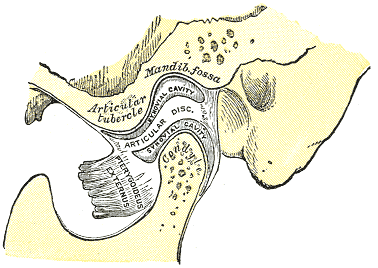
- Sagittal section of the articulation of the mandible (articular disk visible at center)

Details

Identifiers
- Latin: discus articularis articulationis temporomandibularis
- MeSH: D019224
- TA98: A03.1.07.002
- TA2: 1623
- FMA: 57059

The articular disk of the temporomandibular joint is a thin, oval plate made of non-vascular fibrous connective tissue located between the mandible's condyloid process and the cranium's mandibular fossa.

Its upper surface is concavo-convex from before backward, to accommodate itself to the form of the mandibular fossa and the articular tubercle. Its lower surface, in contact with the condyle, is concave. Its circumference is connected to the articular capsule, and in front to the tendon of the lateral pterygoid muscle. It is thicker at its periphery, especially behind, than at its center.

The fibers of which the disc is composed have a concentric arrangement, more apparent at the circumference than at the center. It divides the joint into two cavities, each of which is furnished with a synovial membrane.

It is attached as follows.

- The anterior portion of the disc attaches inferiorly to the anterior condyle and superiorly to the eminence by bending with the joint capsule.
- Posteriorly, the disc attaches superiorly to the temporal bone and inferiorly to the posterior condyle (the posterior attachments are frequently called the bilaminar zone).
- Laterally and medially, the disc attachments blend into the joint capsule near its attachment to the condylar head.

The disc prevents the mandible from moving posteriorly.
