= Temporomandibular joint =

Joints connecting the jawbone to the skull

- The temporomandibular joint is the joint between the mandible and the temporal bone of the skull.

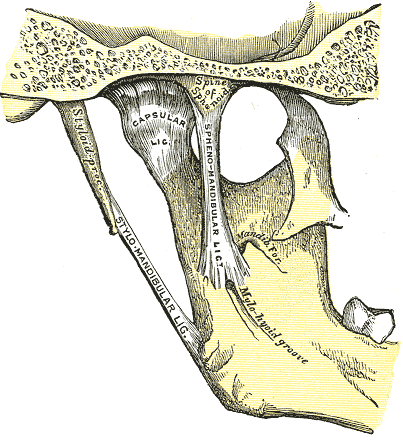
- The joint seen from the inner surface.

Details
- Artery: Superficial temporal artery
- Nerve: Auriculotemporal nerve, masseteric nerve

Identifiers
- Latin: articulatio temporomandibularis
- Acronym: TMJ
- MeSH: D013704
- TA98: A03.1.07.001
- TA2: 1622
- FMA: 54832

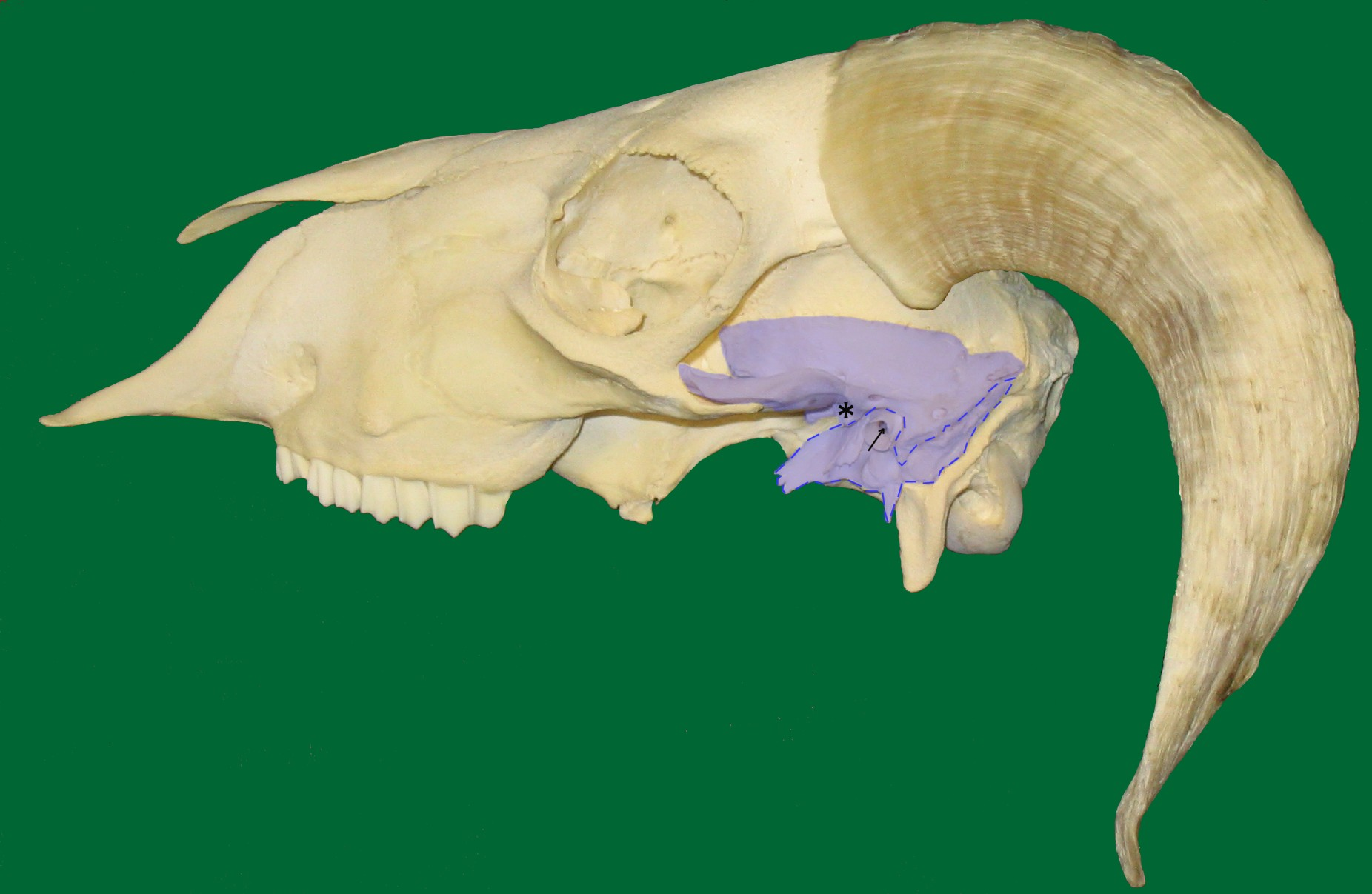
Skull of a sheep. Temporal bone (os temporale) coloured. Line: tympanicum: articular face for temporomandibular joint; arrow: external acoustic pore.

In anatomy, the temporomandibular joints (TMJ) are the two joints connecting the jawbone to the skull. It is a bilateral synovial articulation between the temporal bone of the skull above and the condylar process of mandible below; it is from these bones that its name is derived. The joints are unique in their bilateral function, being connected via the mandible.

== Structure ==
The main components are the joint capsule, articular disc, mandibular condyles, articular surface of the temporal bone, temporomandibular ligament, stylomandibular ligament, sphenomandibular ligament, and lateral pterygoid muscle.

=== Capsule ===
The articular capsule (capsular ligament) is a thin, loose envelope, attached above to the circumference of the mandibular fossa and the articular tubercle immediately in front; below, to the neck of the condyle of the mandible. Its loose attachment to the neck of the mandible allows for free movement.

=== Articular disc ===
The unique feature of the temporomandibular joint is the articular disc. The disc is composed of dense fibrocartilagenous tissue that is positioned between the head of the mandibular condyle and the mandibular fossa of the temporal bone. The temporomandibular joints are one of the few synovial joints in the human body with an articular disc, another being the sternoclavicular joint. The disc divides each joint into two compartments, the lower and upper compartments. These two compartments are synovial cavities, which consist of an upper and a lower synovial cavity. The synovial membrane lining the joint capsule produces the synovial fluid that fills these cavities. The disc is biconcave in shape. The anterior portion of the disc serves as the insertion site for the superior head of the lateral pterygoid. The posterior portion attaches to the temporal bone. Both upper and lower compartments do not communicate with each other unless the disc is damaged.

The central area of the disc is avascular and lacks innervation, thus getting its nutrients from the surrounding synovial fluid. In contrast, the posterior ligament and the surrounding capsules along have both blood vessels and nerves. Few cells are present, but fibroblasts and white blood cells are among these. The central area is also thinner but of denser consistency than the peripheral region, which is thicker but has a more cushioned consistency. With age, the entire disc thins and may undergo the addition of cartilage in the central part, changes that may lead to impaired movement of the joint. The synovial membrane covers the inner surface of the articular capsule in the TMJ, except for the surface of the articular disc and condylar cartilage.

The lower joint compartment formed by the mandible and the articular disc is involved in rotational movement—this is the initial movement of the jaw when the mouth opens. The upper joint compartment formed by the articular disc and the temporal bone is involved in translational movement—this is the secondary gliding motion of the jaw as it is opened widely.

In some cases of anterior disc displacement, the pain felt during movement of the mandible is due to the condyle compressing this area against the articular surface of the temporal bone.

=== Ligaments ===
There are three ligaments associated with the temporomandibular joints: one major and two minor ligaments. These ligaments are important in that they define the border movements, or in other words, the farthest extents of movements, of the mandible. Movements of the mandible made past the extents functionally allowed by the muscular attachments will result in painful stimuli, and thus, movements past these more limited borders are rarely achieved in normal function.

- The major ligament, the temporomandibular ligament, is actually the thickened lateral portion of the capsule, and it has two parts: an outer oblique portion (OOP) and an inner horizontal portion (IHP). The base of this triangular ligament is attached to the zygomatic process of the temporal bone and the articular tubercle; its apex is fixed to the lateral side of the neck of the mandible. This ligament prevents excessive retraction or moving backward of the mandible, a situation that might lead to problems with the joint.
- The two minor ligaments, the stylomandibular and sphenomandibular ligaments are accessory and are not directly attached to any part of the joint.
  - The stylomandibular ligament separates the infratemporal region (anterior) from the parotid region (posterior), and runs from the styloid process to the angle of the mandible; it separates the parotid and submandibular salivary glands. It also becomes taut when the mandible is protruded.
  - The sphenomandibular ligament runs from the spine of the sphenoid bone to the lingula of mandible. The inferior alveolar nerve descends between the sphenomandibular ligament and the ramus of the mandible to gain access to the mandibular foramen. The sphenomandibular ligament, because of its attachment to the lingula, overlaps the opening of the foramen. It is a vestige of the embryonic lower jaw, Meckel cartilage. The ligament becomes accentuated and taut when the mandible is protruded.

Other ligaments, called "oto-mandibular ligaments", connect the middle ear (malleus) with the temporomandibular joint:

- discomallear (or disco-malleolar) ligament,
- malleomandibular (or malleolar-mandibular) ligament.

=== Nerve supply ===
Sensory innervation of the temporomandibular joint is provided by the auriculotemporal nerve and the masseteric nerve (both branches of mandibular nerve (CN V_{3}) which is in turn a branch of the trigeminal nerve (CN V). Free nerve endings, many of which act as nociceptors, innervate the bones, ligaments, and muscles of the TMJ. The fibrocartilage that overlays the TMJ condyle is not innervated.

=== Blood supply ===
Its arterial blood supply is provided by branches of the external carotid artery, predominately the superficial temporal branch. Other branches of the external carotid artery, namely the deep auricular artery, anterior tympanic artery, ascending pharyngeal artery, and maxillary artery, may also contribute to the arterial blood supply of the joint.

The fibrocartilage that overlays the TMJ condyle is avascular in healthy subjects.

=== Development ===
Formation of the temporomandibular joints occurs at around 12 weeks in utero when the joint spaces and the articular disc develop. At approximately 10 weeks the component of the fetus' future joint becomes evident in the mesenchyme between condylar cartilage of the mandible and the developing temporal bone. Two slitlike joint cavities and intervening disk make their appearance in this region by 12 weeks. The mesenchyme around the joint begins to form the fibrous joint capsule. Very little is known about the significance of newly forming muscles in joint formation. The developing superior head of the lateral pterygoid muscle attaches to the anterior portion of the fetal disk. The disk also continues posteriorly through the petrotympanic fissure and attaches to the malleus of the middle ear.

A growth center is located in the head of each mandibular condyle before an individual reaches maturity. This growth center consists of hyaline cartilage underneath the periosteum on the articulating surface of the condyle. This is the last growth center of bone in the body and is multidirectional in its growth capacity, unlike a typical long bone. This area of cartilage within the bone grows in length by appositional growth as the individual grows to maturity. Over time, the cartilage is replaced by bone, using endochondral ossification. This mandibular growth center in the condyle allows the increased length of the mandible needed for the larger permanent teeth, as well as for the larger brain capacity of the adult. This growth of the mandible also influences the overall shape of the face and thus is charted and referred to during orthodontic therapy. When an individual reaches full maturity, the growth center of bone within the condyle has disappeared.

== Function ==
Since the TMJ is connected to the mandible, the right and left joints function together and interdependently.

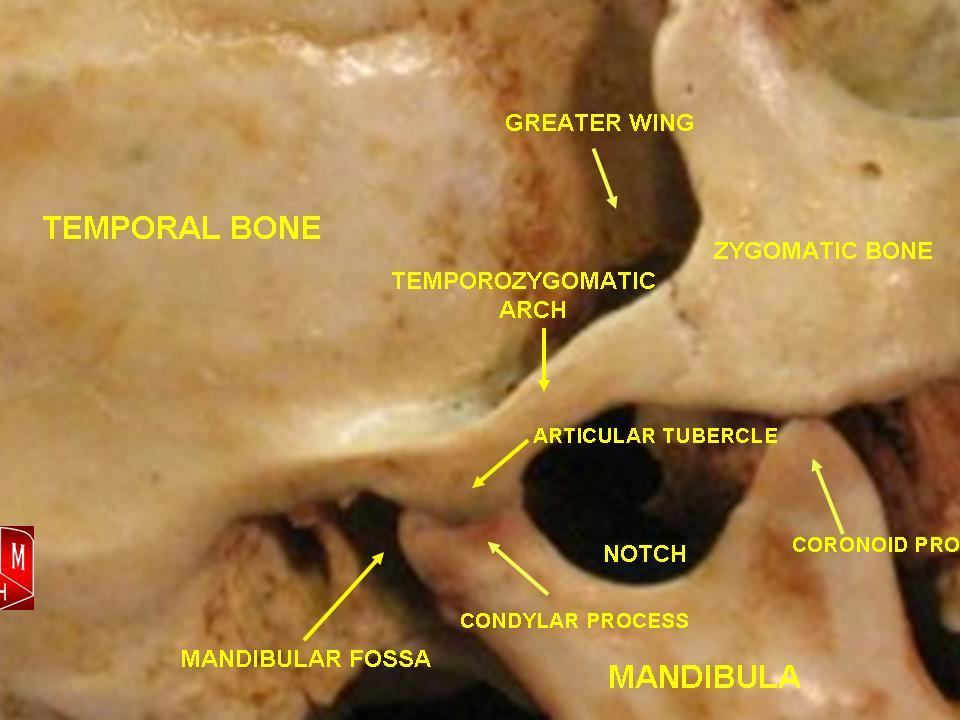
Temporomandibular joint

Each temporomandibular joint is classed as a "ginglymoarthrodial" joint since it is both a ginglymus (hinging joint) and an arthrodial (sliding) joint. The condyle of the mandible articulates with the temporal bone in the mandibular fossa. The mandibular fossa is a concave depression in the squamous portion of the temporal bone.

These two bones are actually separated by an articular disc, which divides the joint into two distinct compartments. The inferior compartment allows for rotation of the condylar head around an instantaneous axis of rotation, corresponding to the first 20mm or so of the opening of the mouth. After the mouth is open to this extent, the mouth can no longer open without the superior compartment of the temporomandibular joints becoming active.

At this point, if the mouth continues to open, not only are the condylar heads rotating within the lower compartment of the temporomandibular joints, but the entire apparatus (condylar head and articular disc) translates. Although this had traditionally been explained as a forward and downward sliding motion, on the anterior concave surface of the mandibular fossa and the posterior convex surface of the articular eminence, this translation actually amounts to a rotation around another axis. This effectively produces an evolute which can be termed the resultant axis of mandibular rotation, which lies in the vicinity of the mandibular foramen, allowing for a low-tension environment for the vasculature and innervation of the mandible.

The necessity of translation to produce further opening past that which can be accomplished with a sole rotation of the condyle can be demonstrated by placing a resistant fist against the chin and trying to open the mouth more than 20 or so mm.

The resting position of the temporomandibular joint is not with the teeth biting together. Instead, the muscular balance and proprioceptive feedback allow a physiologic rest for the mandible, an interocclusal clearance, or freeway space, which is 2 to 4 mm between the teeth.

The temporomandibular joint is less stable when teeth are clenched together (occlusion).

=== Jaw movement ===
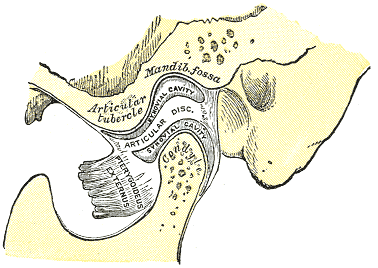
Sagittal section of the articulation of the mandible

Dynamics of temporomandibular joint during voluntary mouth opening and closing visualized by real-time MRI

Normal full jaw opening is 40-50 millimeters as measured from the edge of lower front teeth to edge of upper front teeth.

When measuring the vertical range of motion, the measurement must be adjusted for the overbite. For example, if the measurement from the edge of the lower front teeth to the edge of the upper front teeth is 40 millimeters and the overbite is 3 millimeters, then the jaw opening is 43 millimeters.

During jaw movements, only the mandible moves.

Normal movements of the mandible during function, such as mastication, or chewing, are known as excursions. There are two lateral excursions (left and right) and the forward excursion, known as protrusion. The reversal of protrusion is retrusion.

When the mandible is moved into protrusion, the mandibular incisors, or front teeth of the mandible, are moved so that they first come edge to edge with the maxillary (upper) incisors and then surpass them, producing a temporary underbite. This is accomplished by translation of the condyle down the articular eminence (in the upper portion of the joint) without any more than the slightest amount of rotation taking place (in the lower portion of the joint), other than that necessary to allow the mandibular incisors to come in front of the maxillary incisors without running into them. (This is all assuming an ideal Class I or Class II occlusion.)

During chewing, the mandible moves in a specific manner as delineated by the two temporomandibular joints. The side of the mandible that moves laterally is referred to as either the working or rotating side, while the other side is referred to as either the balancing or orbiting side. The latter terms, although a bit outdated, are actually more precise, as they define the sides by the movements of the respective condyles.

When the mandible is moved into a lateral excursion, the working side condyle (the condyle on the side of the mandible that moves outwards) only performs rotation (in the horizontal plane), while the balancing side condyle performs the translation. During actual functional chewing, when the teeth are not only moved side to side but also up and down when biting of the teeth is incorporated as well, rotation (in a vertical plane) also plays a part in both condyles.

The mandible is moved primarily by the four muscles of mastication: the masseter, medial pterygoid, lateral pterygoid and the temporalis. These four muscles, all innervated by V_{3}, or the mandibular division of the trigeminal nerve, work in different groups to move the mandible in different directions. Contraction of the lateral pterygoid acts to pull the disc and condyle forward within the glenoid fossa and down the articular eminence; thus, the action of this muscle serves to protrude the jaw, it with the assistance of gravity, and the digastricus muscle also opens the jaw. The other three muscles close the mouth; the masseter and the medial pterygoid by pulling up the angle of the mandible and the temporalis by pulling up on the coronoid process of the mandible.

== Clinical significance ==
=== Pain ===
Temporomandibular joint pain is generally due to one of four reasons.

- Myofascial pain dysfunction syndrome, primarily involving the muscles of mastication. This is the most common cause.
- Internal derangements, an abnormal relationship of the disc to any of the other components of the joint. Disc displacement is an example of internal derangement.
- Osteoarthritis of the temporomandibular joint, a degenerative joint disease of the articular surfaces.
- Temporal arteritis, for which it is considered a reliable diagnostic criteria

Pain or dysfunction of the temporomandibular joint is referred to as temporomandibular joint dysfunction or temporomandibular joint disorder (TMD). This term is used to refer to a group of problems involving the temporomandibular joints and the muscles, tendons, ligaments, blood vessels, and other tissues associated with them.

Although rare, other pathologic conditions may also affect the function of temporomandibular joints, causing pain and swelling. These conditions include chondrosarcoma, osteosarcoma, giant cell tumor, and aneurysmal bone cyst.

=== Examination ===
The temporomandibular joints can be felt in front of or within the external acoustic meatus during movements of the mandible. Auscultation of the joint can also be performed.

=== Disc displacement ===
The most common disorder of a temporomandibular joint is disc displacement. In essence, this is when the articular disc, attached anteriorly to the superior head of the lateral pterygoid muscle and posteriorly to the retrodiscal tissue, moves out from between the condyle and the fossa so that the mandible and temporal bone contact is made on something other than the articular disc. This, as explained above, is usually very painful, because, unlike these adjacent tissues, the central portion of the disc contains no sensory innervation.

In most instances of disorder, the disc is displaced anteriorly upon translation, or the anterior and inferior sliding motion of the condyle forward within the fossa and down the articular eminence. On opening, a "pop" or "click" can sometimes be heard and usually felt also, indicating the condyle is moving back onto the disk, known as "reducing the joint" (disc displacement with reduction). Upon closing, the condyle will slide off the back of the disc, hence another "click" or "pop" at which point the condyle is posterior to the disc. Upon clenching, the condyle compresses the bilaminar area, and the nerves, arteries, and veins against the temporal fossa, causing pain and inflammation.

In disc displacement without reduction, the disc stays anterior to the condylar head upon opening. Mouth opening is limited and there is no "pop" or "click" sound on opening.

=== Congenital disorders ===
- Aplasia of mandible or cranial bone
- Hypoplasia of mandible or cranial bone
- Hyperplasia of mandible or cranial bone
- Dysplasia abnormal tissue development

=== Traumatic disorders ===
- Mandibular dislocation
- Fracture
- Subluxation

=== Inflammatory disorders ===
- Synovitis
- Capsulitis
- Myositis

=== Degenerative disorders ===
- Osteoarthritis
- Rheumatoid arthritis
- Juvenile idiopathic arthritis

=== Idiopathic disorders ===
- Temporomandibular disorder (TMD, also termed "temporomandibular joint pain-dysfunction syndrome") is pain and dysfunction of the TMJ and the muscles of mastication (the muscles that move the jaw). TMD does not fit neatly into any one etiologic category since the pathophysiology is poorly understood and it represents a range of distinct disorders with multifactorial etiology. TMD accounts for the majority of pathology of the TMJ, and it is the second most frequent cause of orofacial pain after dental pain (i.e. toothache).
- Fibromyalgia
