= Lateral pterygoid =

Lateral pterygoid may refer to:

- Lateral pterygoid muscle
- Lateral pterygoid nerve
- Lateral pterygoid plate
