= Deep artery =

Deep artery may refer to

- Deep artery of arm
- Deep artery of clitoris
- Deep artery of the penis
- Deep auricular artery
- Deep cervical artery
- Deep plantar artery
- Deep temporal arteries
- Profunda femoris artery, also known as the deep femoral artery
