= Pterygoid fovea =

Concave surface on the medial side of the condyloid process of the mandible

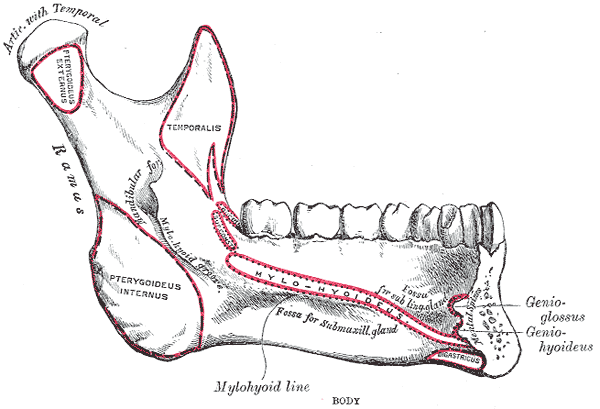
- Medial side of mandible. (Pterygoid fovea not labelled, but indicated as the insertion for the pterygoideus externus on the upper left.)

Details
- Part of: mandible
- System: skeletal

Identifiers
- Latin: fovea pterygoidea
- TA98: A02.1.15.038
- TA2: 875
- FMA: 59478

The pterygoid fovea (occasionally called the pterygoid pit or the pterygoid depression) is located on the mandible. It is a concave surface on the medial side of the neck of the condyloid process of the mandible. It is located posterior to the mandibular notch and inferior to the mandibular condyle. The pterygoid fovea is the site of insertion for the inferior head of the lateral pterygoid muscle.
