= Auricular artery =

Auricular artery may refer to:

- Deep auricular artery
- Posterior auricular artery
