= Ebba Berglund =

Swedish ice hockey player (born 1998)

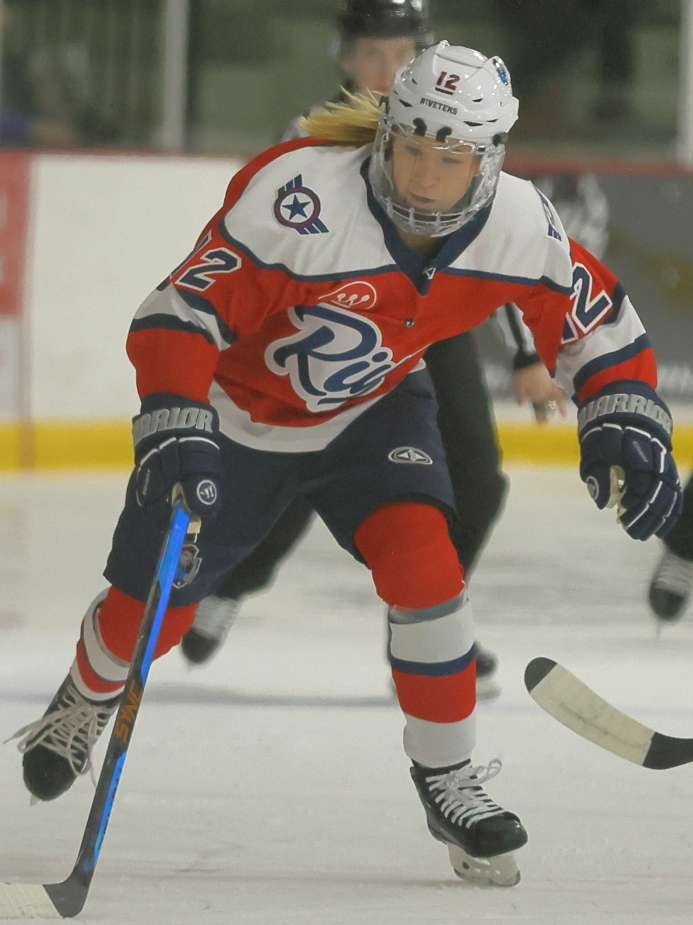
- Berglund with the Metropolitan Riveters in 2022
- Born: 13 June 1998 (age 28) Själevad, Örnsköldsvik, Sweden
- Height: 160 cm (5 ft 3 in)
- Weight: 65 kg (143 lb; 10 st 3 lb)
- Position: Defense
- Shoots: Left
- SDHL team Former teams: MoDo Hockey: Metropolitan Riveters; HV71; Luleå HF/MSSK; Linköping HC
- National team: Sweden
- Playing career: 2013–present

Ebba Sara Amanda Berglund (born 13 June 1998) is a Swedish ice hockey defenseman and member of the Swedish national team. She is captain of MoDo Hockey in the Swedish Women's Hockey League (SDHL).

Berglund represented Sweden at the 2022 Winter Olympics.

== Playing career ==
In her youth, Berglund played in the minor ice hockey department of Modo Hockey in Örnsköldsvik, which she has described as a "hockey-crazy" town. She played for Modo's girls' team and the boys' team when the girls' lacked the requisite number of players.

In the ninth grade, Berglund returned to girls' hockey, playing for Modo's junior team. With Berglund, Modo won the gold medal in the girls' national tournament, Stålbucklan, in 2013 and 2014.

=== Professional career ===
Berglund debuted with Modo's SDHL team in 2014, scoring three points in the 21 games she played that season. In her second season with Modo, she did not score any points but did accrue 20 penalty minutes. For the 2016–17 season, Berglund scored five goals and three assists in 30 games, and was charged with 34 penalty minutes.

After three years with Modo, Berglund signed a one-year contract with Linköping HC, with the intention of subsequently playing college hockey in the United States. The team won silver in the 2017 SDHL championship.

After deciding to remain in the SDHL rather than pursue a career in the NCAA, Berglund began a three-year tour with Luleå HF/MSSK. In 2018, Berglund reported that, over a number of years, she had experienced a dislocated jaw nearly 70 times. During her seasons with Luleå, Berglund won the SDHL championship twice – the 2019–20 championship was cancelled due to the COVID-19 pandemic.

In 2021, Berglund joined HV71 on a 1+1 contract (one-season with a second season option). With HV71, Berglund served as an alternate captain. In April 2022, the club announced that Berglund would not be returning for a second season.

In 2022, Berglund joined the Metropolitan Riveters of the Premier Hockey Federation (PHF) in the United States on a one-year contract. Berglund openly discussed how the PHF drew Swedish players to North America by offering higher pay than the SDHL. In her 20 games with the Riveters, she scored three points and was charged with 20 penalty minutes. She was selected for the 2023 PHF All-Star Game.

In February 2023, Berglund expressed a desire to continue playing with the Riveters, but in April 2023, she agreed to a 1+1 contract with MoDo, returning to her youth club after seven seasons away.

== International career ==
Berglund has played for the Swedish national team at various levels. In 2016, she won the bronze medal with the national under-18 team at the IIHF World Women's U18 Championship. Berglund represented Sweden in the women's ice hockey tournament at the 2022 Winter Olympics in Beijing; she also played in the qualification tournament. She also represented Sweden at the 2022 IIHF Women's World Championship.

== Personal life ==
Berglund was born on 13 June 1998 in Själevad, Örnsköldsvik Municipality.

Berglund is part of the LGBTQ community. She and Canadian ice hockey player Sarah Bujold – who was her teammate on HV71 and the Riveters – were in a relationship for several years during the early 2020s.

In 2021, Berglund participated in a mentorship program to support girls in hockey.

In addition to her career in ice hockey, she is an amateur sailor and has competed in a Swedish championship in sailing in the Albin Express class.

== Career statistics ==
=== Regular season and playoffs ===
| | | | Regular season | | | | | Playoffs |
| Season | Team | League | GP | G | A | Pts | PIM | GP | G | A | Pts | PIM |
|---|---|---|---|---|---|---|---|---|---|---|---|---|
| 2014–15 | Modo Hockey | Riksserien | 21 | 1 | 2 | 3 | 6 | 5 | 0 | 0 | 0 | 4 |
| 2015–16 | Modo Hockey | Riksserien | 35 | 0 | 0 | 0 | 20 | 3 | 0 | 0 | 0 | 2 |
| 2016–17 | Modo Hockey | SDHL | 30 | 5 | 3 | 8 | 34 | 2 | 0 | 0 | 0 | 0 |
| 2017–18 | Linköping HC | SDHL | 34 | 1 | 6 | 7 | 34 | 9 | 0 | 0 | 0 | 0 |
| 2018–19 | Luleå HF | SDHL | 35 | 2 | 2 | 4 | 16 | 11 | 0 | 2 | 2 | 8 |
| 2019–20 | Luleå HF | SDHL | 32 | 3 | 8 | 11 | 16 | 6 | 0 | 0 | 0 | 2 |
| 2020–21 | Luleå HF | SDHL | 36 | 2 | 4 | 6 | 16 | 9 | 0 | 2 | 2 | 6 |
| 2021–22 | HV71 | SDHL | 33 | 2 | 11 | 13 | 30 | 6 | 0 | 1 | 1 | 6 |
| 2022–23 | Metropolitan Riveters | PHF | 22 | 1 | 2 | 3 | 20 | – | – | – | – | — |
| SDHL totals | | | 256 | 16 | 36 | 52 | 164 | 51 | 0 | 5 | 5 | 28 |

=== International ===
| Year | Team | Event | Result | GP | G | A | Pts | PIM |
|---|---|---|---|---|---|---|---|---|
| 2016 | Sweden U18 | WW18 | 3rd place, bronze medalist(s) | 6 | 0 | 1 | 1 | 2 |
| 2021 | Sweden | OGQ | Q | 3 | 0 | 0 | 0 | 2 |
| 2022 | Sweden | OG | 8th | 5 | 1 | 0 | 1 | 8 |
| 2022 | Sweden | WW | 7th | 6 | 0 | 0 | 0 | 2 |
| Senior totals | | | | 14 | 1 | 0 | 1 | 12 |
