= Pterygoid nerve =

Pterygoid nerve may refer to:

- Medial pterygoid nerve
- Lateral pterygoid nerve
