= Muscles of mastication =

Muscles that aid chewing

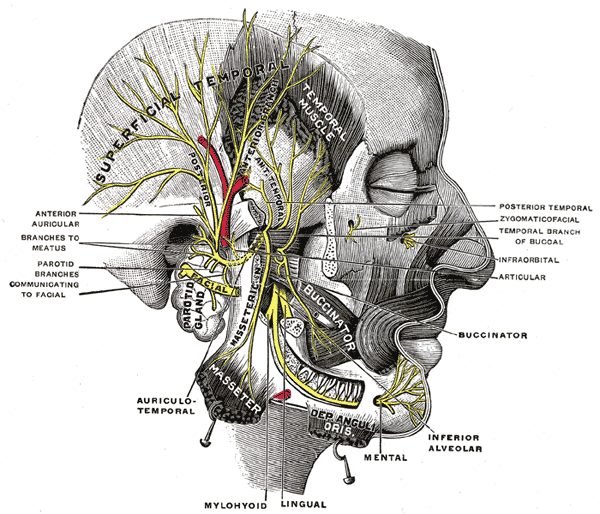
- Mandibular division of the trigeminal nerve

Details
- Nerve: Mandibular nerve

Identifiers
- Latin: musculi masticatorii
- MeSH: D008410
- TA98: A04.1.04.001
- TA2: 2104
- FMA: 74060

The four classical muscles of mastication elevate the mandible (closing the jaw) and move it forward/backward and laterally, facilitating biting and chewing. Other muscles are responsible for opening the jaw, namely the geniohyoid, mylohyoid, and digastric muscles (the lateral pterygoid may play a role).

== Structure ==
The muscles are:

- The masseter (composed of the superficial and deep head)
- The temporalis (the sphenomandibularis is considered a part of the temporalis by some sources, and a distinct muscle by others)
- The medial pterygoid
- The lateral pterygoid

In humans, the mandible, or lower jaw, is connected to the temporal bone of the skull via the temporomandibular joint. This is an extremely complex joint which permits movement in all planes. The muscles of mastication originate on the skull and insert into the mandible, thereby allowing for jaw movements during contraction.

Each of these primary muscles of mastication is paired, with each side of the mandible possessing one of the four.

=== Innervation ===
Unlike most of the other facial muscles, which are innervated by the facial nerve (or CN VII), the muscles of mastication are innervated by the trigeminal nerve (or CN V). More specifically, they are innervated by the mandibular branch, or V_{3}. The mandibular nerve is both sensory and motor.

=== Development ===
Embryologically, the muscles of mastication are all derived from the first pharyngeal arch.

The muscles of facial expression, on the other hand, are derived from the second pharyngeal arch.

== Function ==
The mandible is the only bone that moves during mastication and other activities, such as talking.

While these four muscles are the primary participants in mastication, other muscles help with the process, such as those of the tongue and the cheeks.

| Prime mover | Movement | Origin | Insertion |
|---|---|---|---|
| Masseter | Elevates mandible (closes mouth and aids chewing) | Zygomatic arch | Mandible (coronoid process and ramus) |
| Temporalis | Elevates and retracts mandible (closes mouth; pulls lower jaw in/backward) | Temporal bone | Mandible (coronoid process and ramus) |
| Lateral pterygoid | Depresses, protracts, laterally moves mandible (opens mouth; pushes lower jaw out/forward; moves lower jaw side to side) | Superior head: infratemporal surface of greater wing of sphenoid bone Inferior head: lateral pterygoid plate of sphenoid bone | Mandible; temporo-mandibular joint |
| Medial pterygoid | Elevates, protracts, laterally moves mandible (closes mouth; pushes lower jaw out/forward; moves lower jaw side-to-side) | Deep head: medial surface of lateral pterygoid plate and palatine bone Superficial head: tuberosity of maxilla | Mandible (medial ramus below the mandibular foramen) |

== Clinical significance ==
- Temporomandibular joint disorder
- Bruxism
