= Sphenomandibularis =

Masticatory muscle

The sphenomandibularis is a muscle attaching to the sphenoid bone and the mandible. It is a muscle of mastication. Unlike most of the muscles of the human body, which had been categorized several centuries ago, the sphenomandibularis was discovered in the mid-1990s at the University of Maryland at Baltimore. The findings were published in 1996. The sphenomandibularis is considered by many sources to be a portion of the temporalis, rather than a distinct muscle.
