= Retromolar fossa =

Depression in the mandible (jawbone)

The retromolar fossa is a fossa of the mandible located posteriorly to the third molar. Part of the temporal muscle's tendon inserts into it.
