= Caroticotympanic arteries =

Details
- Precursor: Aortic arch 2
- Source: Petrous portion of the internal carotid artery
- Supplies: Tympanic cavity

Identifiers
- Latin: arteriae caroticotympanicae, ramus caroticotympanicus
- TA98: A12.2.06.005
- TA2: 4464
- FMA: 71691

The caroticotympanic artery (tympanic branch) is a small, sometimes doubled artery which arises from (the petrous portion of) the internal carotid artery. It leaves the carotid canal through a foramen to reach the tympanic cavity. It contributes arterial supply to the osseous part of the pharyngotympanic tube (Eustachian tube).

== Anatomy ==
=== Anastomoses ===
It forms anastomoses with the anterior tympanic branch of the maxillary artery, and the stylomastoid artery.

=== Variation ===
Because the caroticotympanic artery is more often absent than present, some controversy exists as to whether these are should be classified as an anatomical variation. Nevertheless, its relevance to internal carotid artery pathologies supports its continued classification as a non-variation anatomical structure. Additionally, the origin of the caroticotympanic artery as a vestige of the embryonic hyoid artery provides a developmental reason for its continued classification as a canonical branch.

== See also ==
- Caroticotympanic nerves
