= Pterygoid branches of maxillary artery =

- Plan of branches of internal maxillary artery. (Pterygoid labeled at center top.)

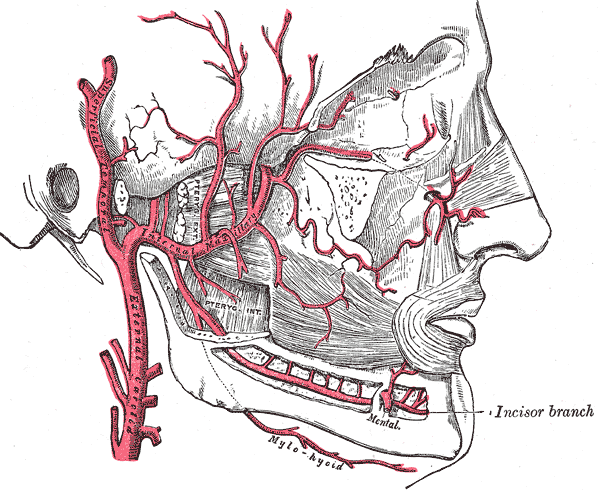
- Plan of branches of internal maxillary artery. (Visible but not labeled.)

Details
- Source: maxillary artery

Identifiers
- Latin: rami pterygoidei arteriae maxillaris
- TA98: A12.2.05.073
- TA2: 4442
- FMA: 71682

The pterygoid branches of the maxillary artery, irregular in their number and origin, supply the lateral pterygoid muscle and medial pterygoid muscle.

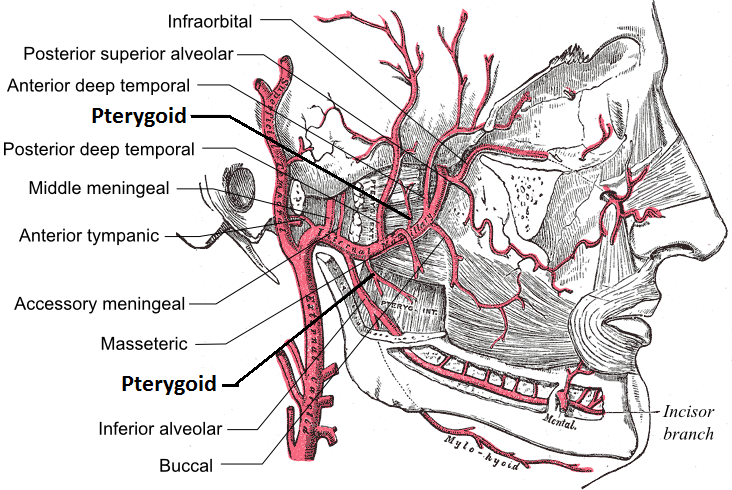
Branches of the maxillary artery.
