= Articular disc of sternoclavicular joint =

Plate between sternum and clavicle

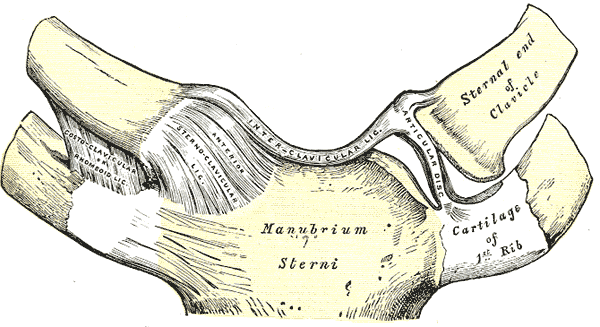
- The sternoclavicular joint, viewed from the front. (Articular disc labeled at upper right.)

Details

Identifiers
- Latin: discus articularis articulationis sternoclavicularis

The articular disc of the sternoclavicular joint is flat and nearly circular, interposed between the articulating surfaces of the sternum and clavicle.

It is attached, above, to the upper and posterior border of the articular surface of the clavicle; below, to the cartilage of the first rib, near its junction with the sternum; and by its circumference to the interclavicular and anterior and posterior sternoclavicular ligaments.

It is thicker at the circumference, especially its upper and back part, than at its center.

It divides the joint into two cavities, each of which is furnished with a synovial membrane.

== See also ==
- Articular disc
