= Temporomandibular ligament =

Ligament connecting the zygomatic arch to the mandible

- Articulation of the mandible. Lateral aspect.

Details
- System: skeletal
- From: zygomatic process of temporal bone
- To: condyloid process (mandible)

Identifiers
- Latin: ligamentum laterale articulationis temporomandibularis, ligamentum temporomandibulare
- TA98: A03.1.07.003
- TA2: 1624
- FMA: 57071

The temporomandibular ligament, also known as the external lateral ligament, is a ligament that connects the lower articular tubercle of the zygomatic arch to the lateral and posterior border of the neck of the mandible. It prevents posterior displacement of the mandible. It also prevents the condyloid process from being driven upward by a blow to the jaw, which would otherwise fracture the base of the skull.

== Structure ==
The temporomandibular ligament originates from the lower articular tubercle of the zygomatic arch. This usually has a rough surface for the ligament to attach to. It attaches to the lateral and posterior border of the neck of the mandible.

It consists of two short, narrow fasciculi, one in front of the other. It is broader above than below, and its fibers are directed obliquely downward and backward.

It is covered by the parotid gland, and by the integument.

== Function ==
The temporomandibular ligament constrains the mandible as it opens, keeping the condyloid process close to the joint. It prevents posterior displacement of the mandible. It also prevents the condyloid process from being driven upward by a blow to the jaw, which would otherwise fracture the base of the skull.
