= Deep auricular artery =

- Plan of branches of internal maxillary artery. (Label "Deep auric." visible at upper left.)

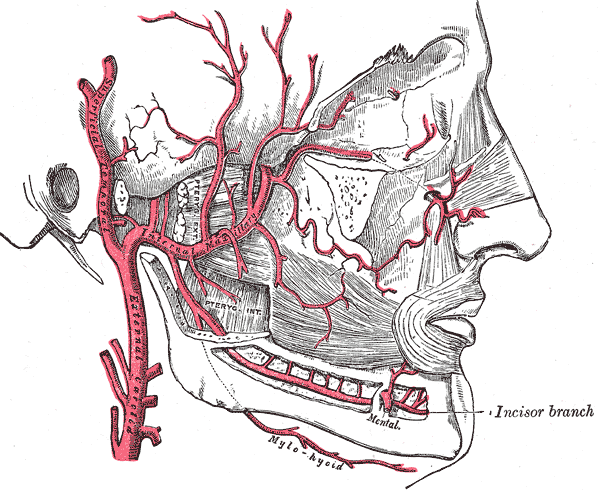
- Plan of branches of internal maxillary artery. (Deep auricular visible but not labeled.)

Details
- Source: maxillary artery

Identifiers
- Latin: arteria auricularis profunda
- TA98: A12.2.05.054
- TA2: 4423
- FMA: 49689

The deep auricular artery is a branch of the maxillary artery. The deep auricular artery pierces the external acoustic meatus. It provides arterial supply to the skin of the external acoustic meatus, and contributes arterial supply to the tympanic membrane, and (via a branch) the temporomandibular joint.

== Anatomy ==
=== Origin ===
It is a branch of the (mandibular part of) the maxillary artery. It often arises in common with the anterior tympanic artery.

=== Course ===
It ascends in the substance of the parotid gland, behind the temporomandibular articulation, and pierces the cartilaginous or bony wall of the external acoustic meatus to course between the cartilage and bone.

=== Distribution ===
It supplies its cuticular lining and the outer surface of the tympanic membrane.

It gives a branch to the temporomandibular joint.
