= Deep temporal arteries =

Artery of the head

- Plan of branches of internal maxillary artery. (Post. deep temporal and ant. deep temporal labeled at center top.)

Details
- Source: Maxillary artery (2nd part)

Identifiers
- Latin: arteria temporalis profunda anterior, arteria temporalis profunda posterior
- TA98: A12.2.05.071; A12.2.05.072
- FMA: 49742

The deep temporal arteries are two arteries of the head. They ascend between the temporalis muscle and the pericranium. They anastomose with the middle temporal artery, among other vessels. They supply the temporalis muscle.

== Structure ==
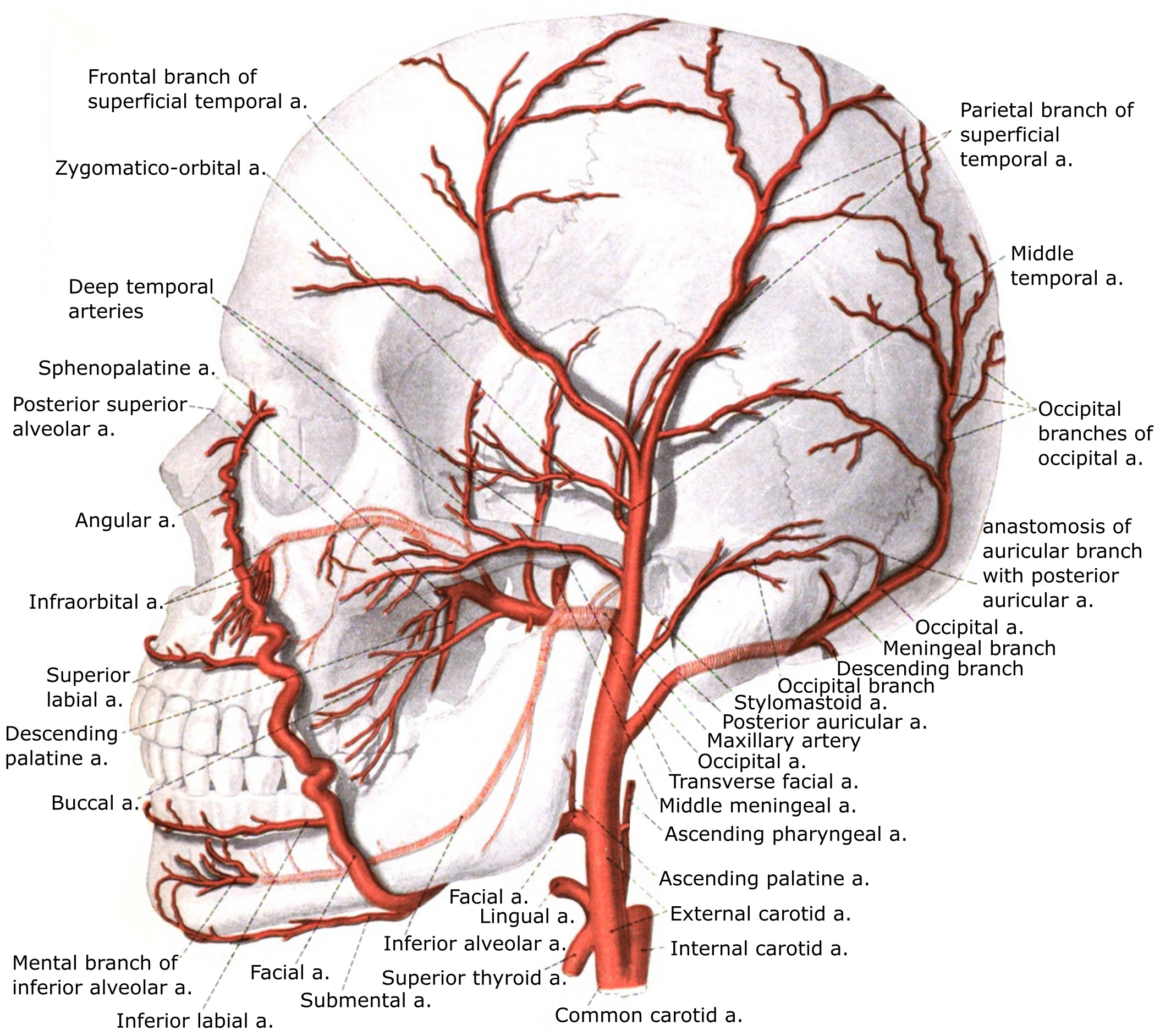
The deep temporal arteries in relation to other arteries of the outer skull, visible at centre.

The deep temporal arteries consist of an anterior and a posterior artery. They are branches of the maxillary artery, a terminal branch of the external carotid artery. They ascend between the temporalis muscle and the pericranium.

=== Connections ===
The deep temporal arteries anastomose with the middle temporal artery.

The anterior artery communicates with the lacrimal artery by means of small branches which perforate the zygomatic bone and greater wing of the sphenoid bone. It may also communicate with the ophthalmic artery, a branch of the internal carotid artery.

== Function ==
The deep temporal arteries supply the temporalis muscle.

== Clinical significance ==
The deep temporal arteries may be affected by giant cell arteritis. This may be diagnosed using magnetic resonance imaging.

== Other animals ==
The deep temporal arteries are found in other animals, including dogs.

== See also ==
- Deep temporal nerves
