= Maxillary artery =

Artery supplying face structures in humans

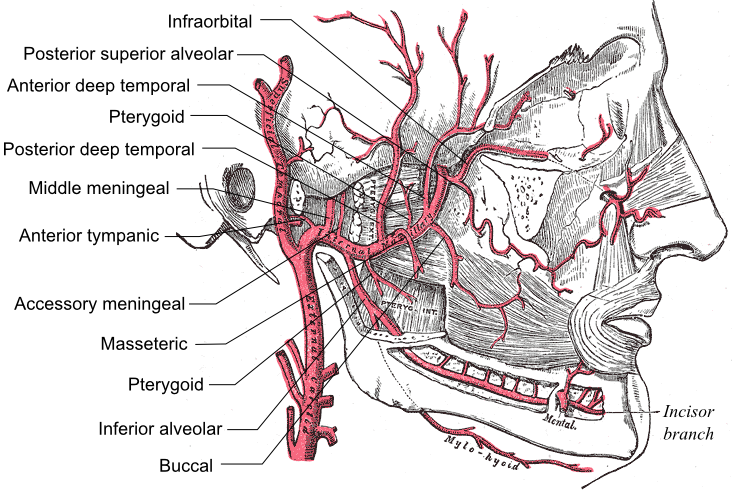
- Maxillary artery and its branches. ("Internal maxillary" is horizontal at left center.)

- Plan of branches of maxillary artery.

Details
- Precursor: Aortic arch 1
- Source: External carotid artery
- Branches: 1st part: anterior tympanic - deep auricular - middle meningeal - superior tympanic artery - accessory meningeal - inferior alveolar 2nd part: Posterior deep temporal artery - Pterygoid branches - masseteric - buccinator - Anterior deep temporal artery 3rd part: posterior superior alveolar - infraorbital - descending palatine - artery of the pterygoid canal - sphenopalatine
- Vein: Maxillary veins

Identifiers
- Latin: arteria maxillaris
- MeSH: D008438
- TA98: A12.2.05.053
- TA2: 4422
- FMA: 49675

The maxillary artery (eg, internal maxillary artery) supplies deep structures of the face. It branches from the external carotid artery just deep to the neck of the mandible.

== Structure ==
The maxillary artery, the larger of the two terminal branches of the external carotid artery, arises behind the neck of the mandible, and is at first imbedded in the substance of the parotid gland; it passes forward between the ramus of the mandible and the sphenomandibular ligament, and then runs, either superficial or deep to the lateral pterygoid muscle, to the pterygopalatine fossa.

It supplies the deep structures of the face, and may be divided into mandibular, pterygoid, and pterygopalatine portions.

=== First portion ===
The first or mandibular or bony portion passes horizontally forward, between the neck of the mandible and the sphenomandibular ligament, where it lies parallel to and a little below the auriculotemporal nerve; it crosses the inferior alveolar nerve, and runs along the lower border of the lateral pterygoid muscle.

Branches include:

- Deep auricular artery
- Anterior tympanic artery
- Middle meningeal artery
- Inferior alveolar artery which gives off its mylohyoid branch just prior to entering the mandibular foramen
- Accessory meningeal artery

=== Second portion ===
The second or pterygoid or muscular portion runs obliquely forward and upward under cover of the ramus of the mandible and insertion of the temporalis, on the superficial (very frequently on the deep) surface of the lateral pterygoid muscle; it then passes between the two heads of origin of this muscle and enters the fossa.

Branches include:

- Masseteric artery
- Pterygoid branches
- Deep temporal arteries (anterior and posterior)
- Buccal artery

=== Third portion ===
The third or pterygopalatine or pterygomaxillary portion lies in the pterygopalatine fossa in relation with the pterygopalatine ganglion. This is considered the terminal branch of the maxillary artery.

Branches include:

- Sphenopalatine artery (nasopalatine artery) is the terminal branch of the Maxillary artery
- Descending palatine artery (Greater palatine artery and lesser palatine artery)
- Infraorbital artery
- Posterior superior alveolar artery
- Artery of pterygoid canal
- Pharyngeal branch, directed to palatovaginal canal
- Middle superior alveolar artery (a branch of the infraorbital artery)
- Anterior superior alveolar arteries (a branch of the infraorbital artery)

== Nomenclature ==
- Formerly, the term "external maxillary artery" was used to describe what is now known as the facial artery (per Terminologia anatomica.) Currently, the term "external maxillary artery" is less commonly used, and the terms "internal maxillary artery" and "maxillary artery" are equivalent.

== Additional images ==
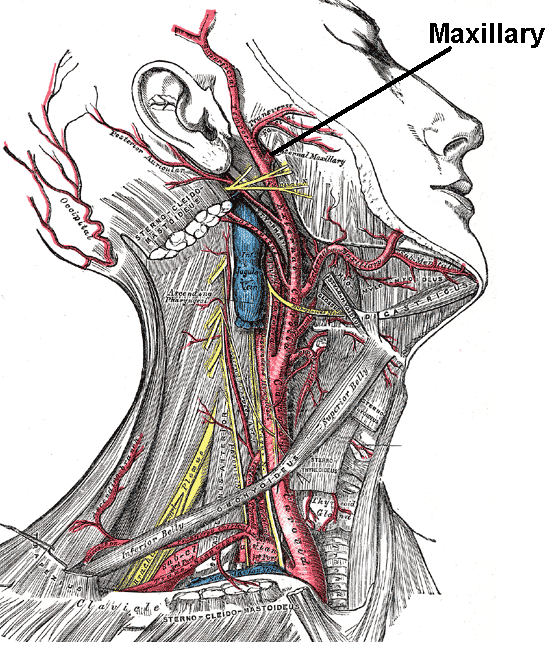
Superficial dissection of the right side of the neck, showing the carotid and subclavian arteries. Origin of maxillary artery is labeled.

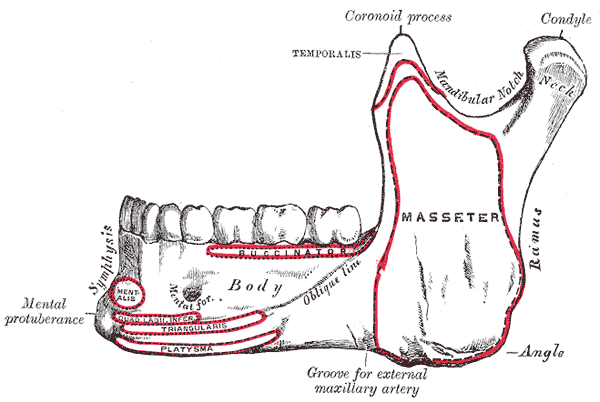
Mandible. Outer surface. Side view.

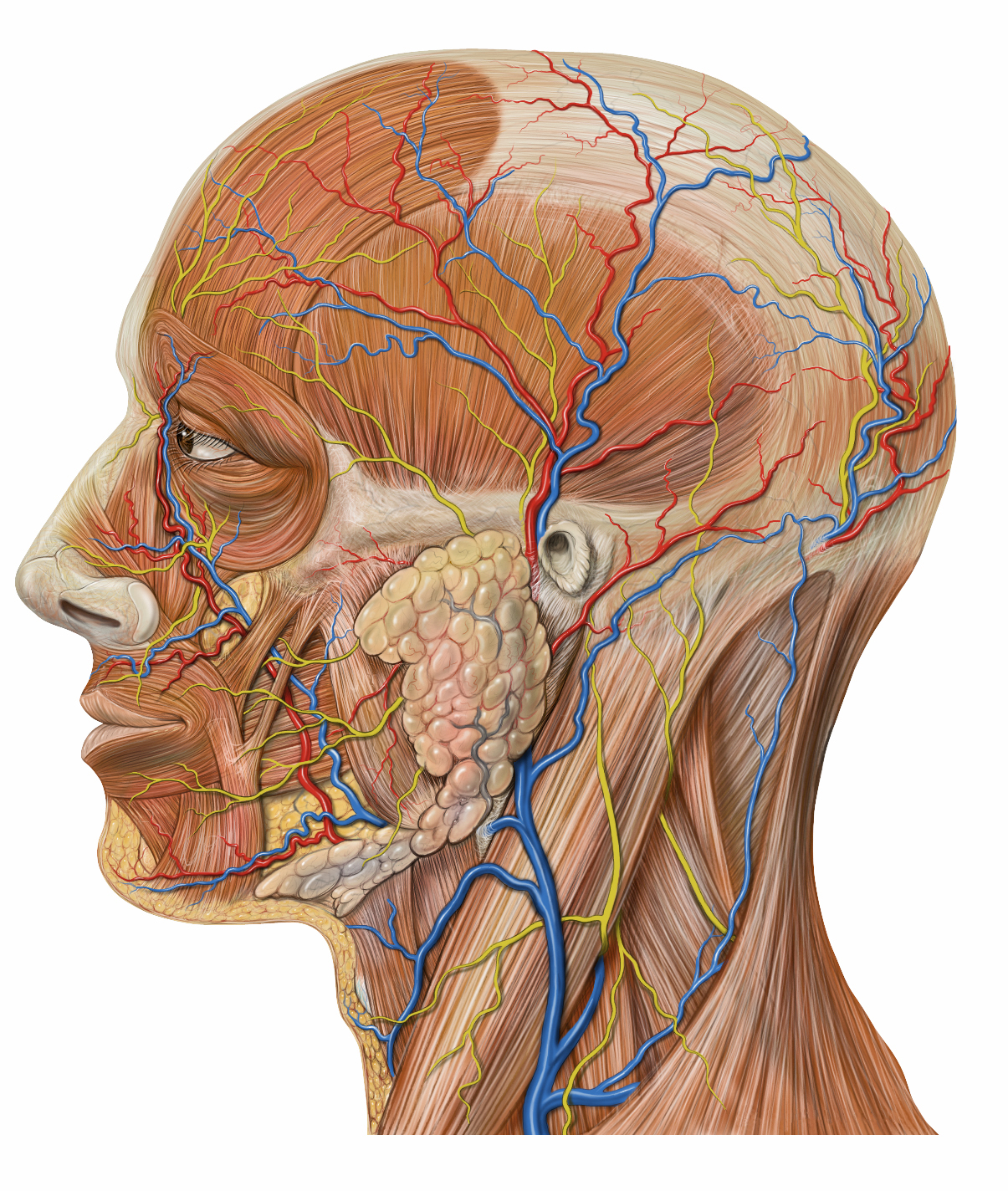
Lateral head anatomy detail

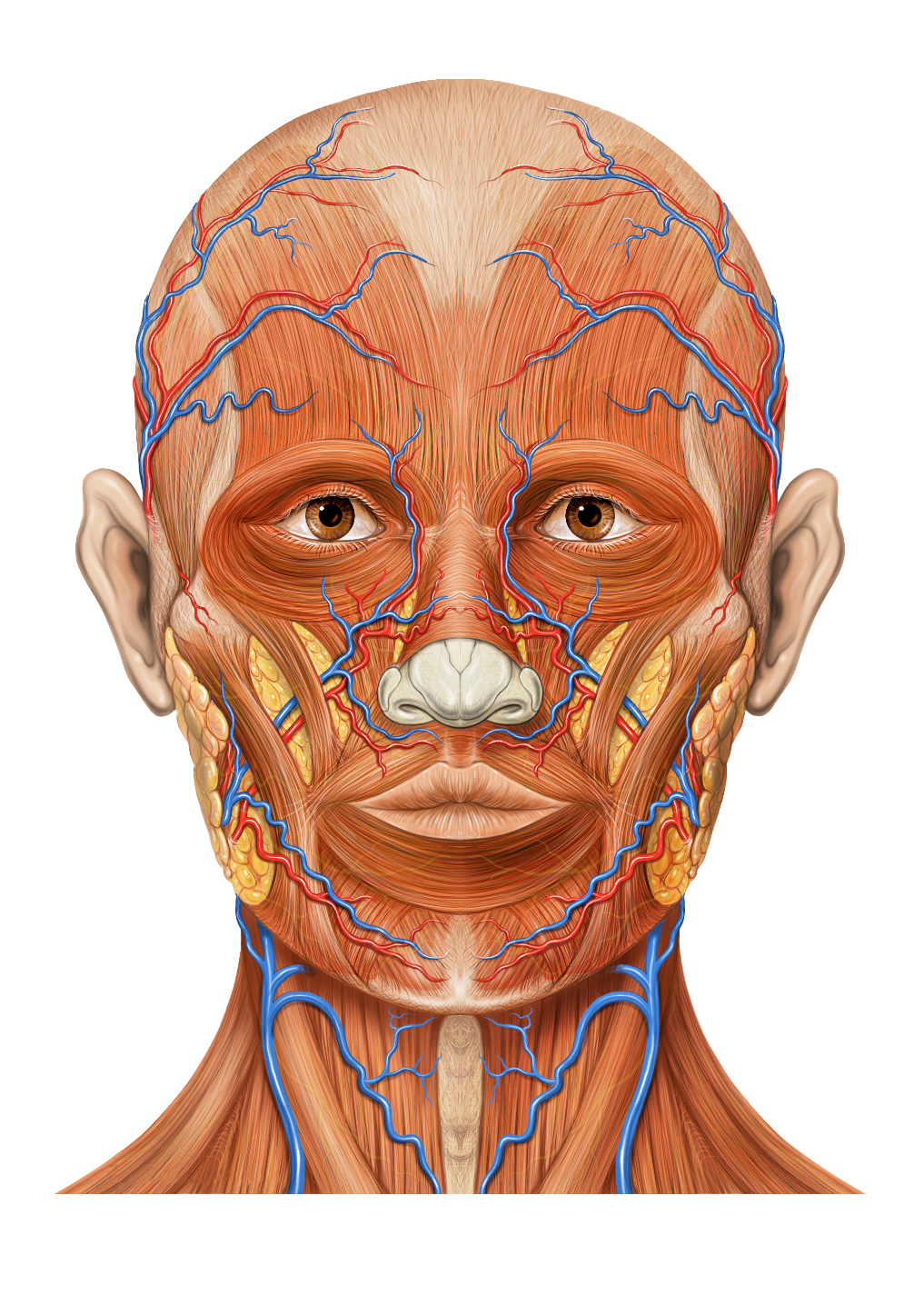
Head anatomy anterior view

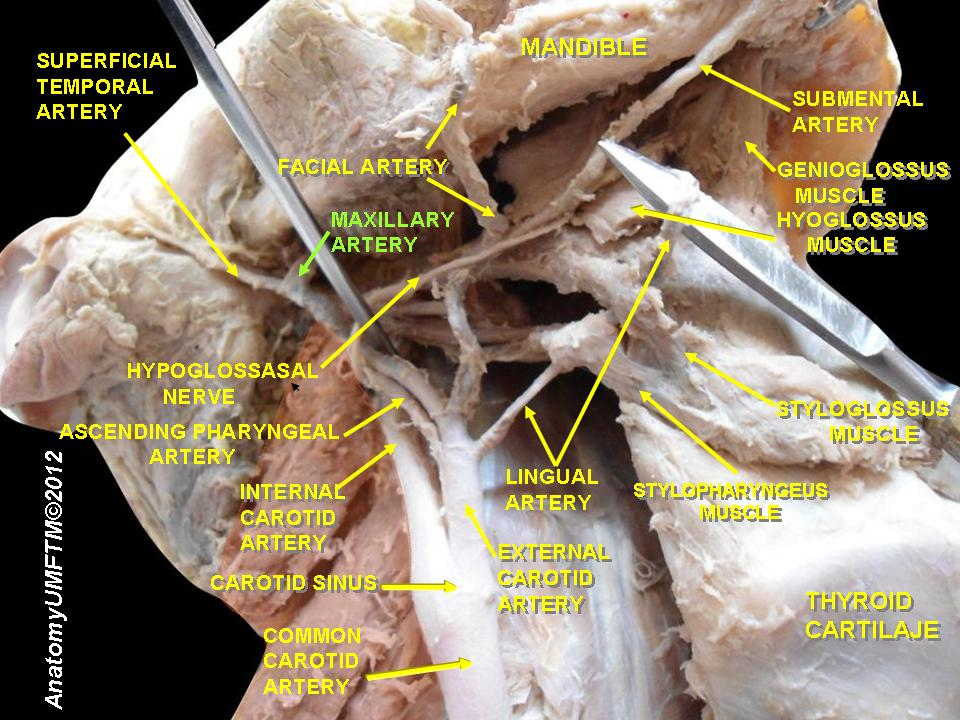
Maxillary artery

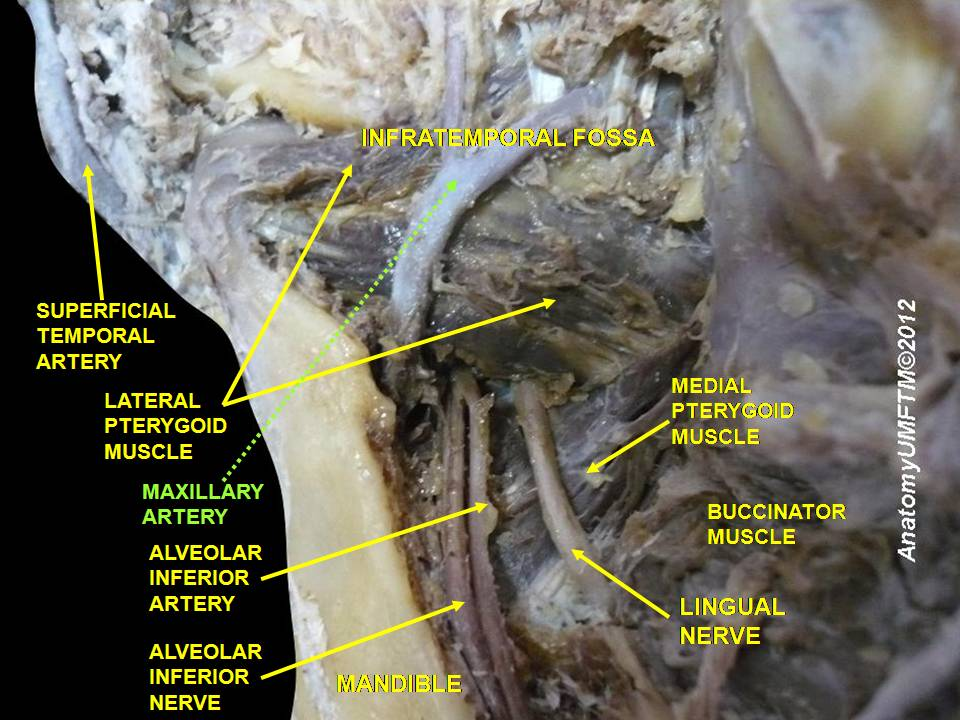
Maxillary artery

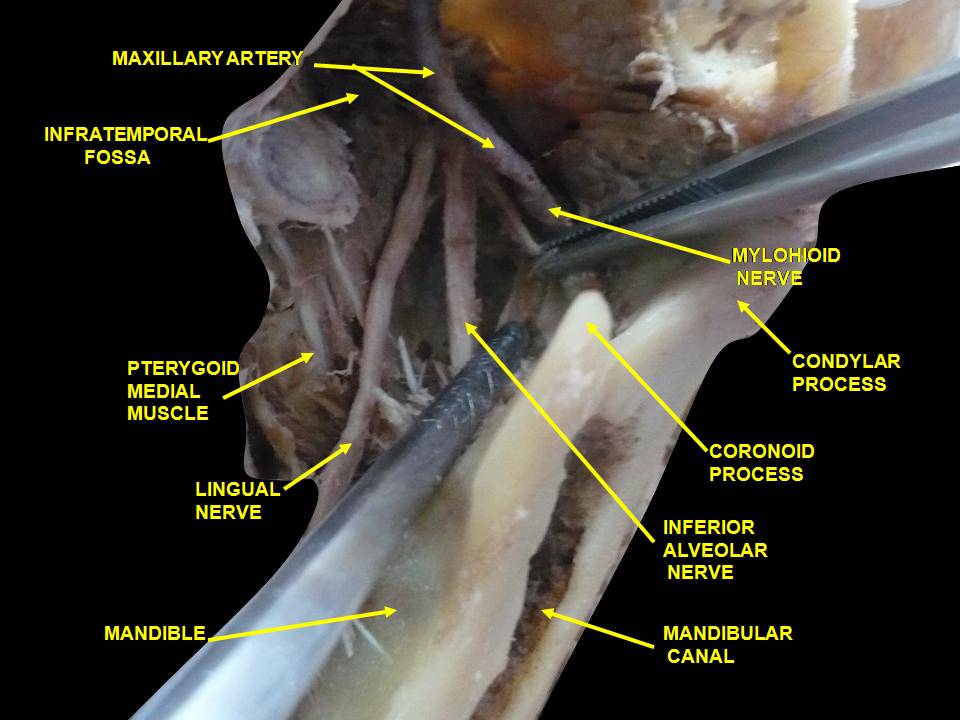
Infratemporal fossa. Lingual and inferior alveolar nerve. Deep dissection. Anterolateral view
