= Caroticotympanic nerves =

Details
- From: internal carotid plexus
- To: tympanic plexus

Identifiers
- Latin: nervi caroticotympanici
- TA98: A14.2.01.142
- TA2: 6648
- FMA: 67562

The caroticotympanic nerves are post-ganglionic sympathetic branches from the internal carotid plexus which leave the carotid canal through the wall of this canal to enter the tympanic cavity and participate in the formation of the tympanic plexus upon the promontory of tympanic cavity. They travel with the caroticotympanic artery.

== See also ==
- Caroticotympanic arteries
