= Anterior tympanic artery =

- Branches of maxillary artery (anterior tympanic artery at upper left)

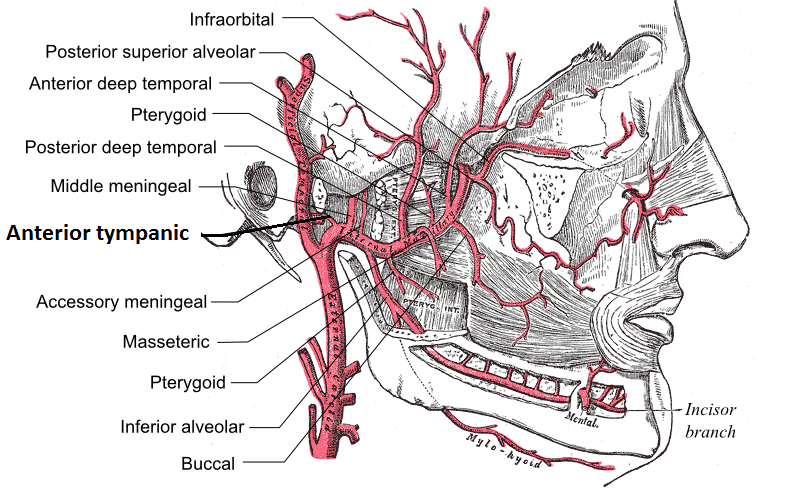
- Branches of the maxillary artery

Details
- Precursor: Stapedial artery - maxillomandibular branch
- Supplies: Middle ear

Identifiers
- Latin: arteria tympanica anterior
- TA98: A12.2.05.055
- TA2: 4425
- FMA: 49692

The anterior tympanic artery (glaserian artery) is a branch of (the mandibular part of) the maxillary artery. It passes through the petrotympanic fissure to enter the middle ear where it contributes to the formation of the circular anastomosis around the tympanic membrane. It provides arterial supply to part of the lining of the middle ear. It is accompanied by the chorda tympani nerve.

== Anatomy ==
=== Course and anastomoses ===
It passes upward behind the temporomandibular articulation, enters the tympanic cavity through the petrotympanic fissure, and ramifies upon the tympanic membrane, forming a vascular circle around the membrane with the stylomastoid branch of the posterior auricular, and anastomosing with the artery of the pterygoid canal and with the caroticotympanic branch from the internal carotid.
