= Articular disc =

Anatomical feature in joint cavities

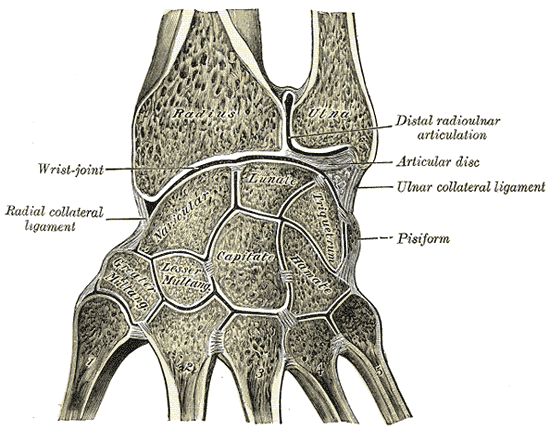
- Vertical section through the articulations at the wrist, showing the synovial cavities. (Articular disk labeled at center right.)

Details

Identifiers
- Latin: discus articularis
- TA98: A03.0.00.032
- TA2: 1543
- FMA: 76690

The articular disc (or disk) is a thin, oval plate of fibrocartilage present in several joints which separates synovial cavities. This separation of the cavity space allows for separate movements to occur in each space.

The presence of an articular disk also permits a more even distribution of forces between the articulating surfaces of bones, increases the stability of the joint, and aids in directing the flow of synovial fluid to areas of the articular cartilage that experience the most friction.

The term "meniscus" has a very similar meaning.

== Additional images ==
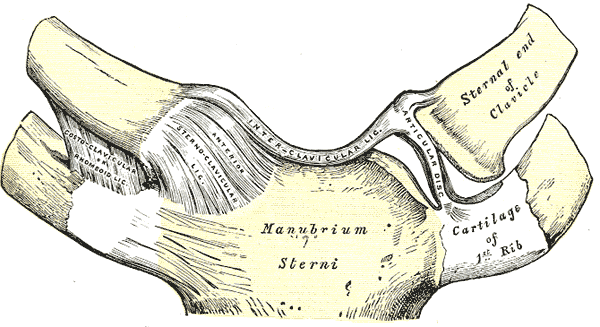
Sternoclavicular articulation. Anterior view.

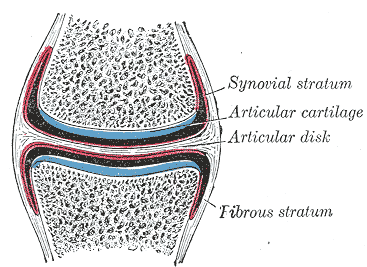
Diagrammatic section of a diarthrodial joint, with an articular disk.

== See also ==
- Triangular fibrocartilage ("articular disk of the distal radioulnar articulation")
- Articular disk of the temporomandibular joint
- Articular disk of sternoclavicular articulation
