= Gnathodynamometer =

Device used to measure human bite force

A gnathodynamometer (or occlusometer) is an instrument for measuring the force exerted in closing the mouth. It can measure the bite force of humans in the following three measurements: newtons, (N), pounds, (lb), or kilograms, (kg). The average bite force of a human being is 140 pounds. A bimeter gnathodynamometer is one with an adjustable central-bearing point.

As per the inventor's design study, the instrument works well "in measuring maximal bite force and masticatory efficiency of incisor and molar teeth, respectively."

Sharks are baited into biting hard plastic sheets, which are brought to the laboratory. The depth of the indentations shows the force of the bite. The inventor is J. N. Snodgrass.

== Sources ==
Please expand article with

- Ortuğ G (July 2002). "A new device for measuring mastication force (Gnathodynamometer)". Ann. Anat. 184 (4): 393–6. doi:10.1016/S0940-9602(02)80063-2. PMID 12201050.
- http://www.elasmo-research.org/education/topics/r_bites.htm
- http://animal.discovery.com/convergence/safari/shark/expert/expert14.html
