= Lateral pterygoid nerve =

Branch of the anterior division of the mandibular nerve

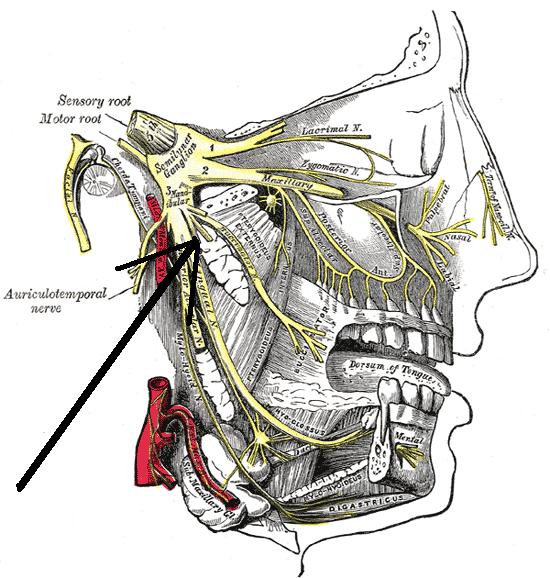
- Distribution of the maxillary and mandibular nerves, and the submaxillary ganglion.

Details
- From: Anterior division of mandibular nerve
- Innervates: Lateral pterygoid muscle

Identifiers
- Latin: nervus pterygoideus externus nervus pterygoideus lateralis
- TA98: A14.2.01.072
- TA2: 6257
- FMA: 53107

The lateral pterygoid nerve (or external pterygoid nerve) is a motor branch of the anterior division of the mandibular nerve (CN V3). It arises in the infratemporal fossa and passes lateral to the lateral pterygoid muscle. It typically originates as two separate branches that travel near the buccal nerve, and enter the deep surfaces of the superior and inferior heads of the lateral pterygoid muscle, which contributes to protrusion and side-to-side motion of the lower jaw during chewing. The nerve is relevant in conditions and surgical procedures involving the infratemporal region and the muscles that control mandibular movement.

== Nerve pathway ==
- trigeminal nerve (CN V)
- mandibular nerve (V3)
- anterior division of mandibular nerve

== Variation ==
Some authors describe the lateral pterygoid nerve as a single branch of the anterior division of the mandibular nerve which then bifurcates to enter the two heads of the lateral pterygoid muscle.
