= Temporalis muscle =

Muscle on the side of the head which aids in chewing

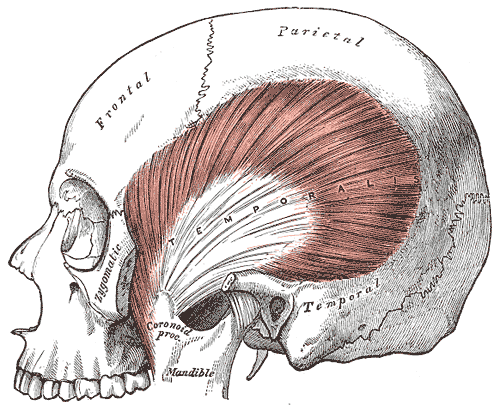
- The temporalis muscle; the zygomatic arch and masseter have been removed.

Details
- Origin: Temporal lines on the parietal bone of the skull and the superior temporal surface of the sphenoid bone
- Insertion: Coronoid process of the mandible and retromolar fossa
- Artery: Deep temporal arteries
- Nerve: Deep temporal nerves, branches of the anterior division of the mandibular nerve (V3)
- Actions: Elevation and retraction of mandible
- Antagonist: Platysma muscle

Identifiers
- Latin: musculus temporalis
- MeSH: D013703
- TA98: A04.1.04.005
- TA2: 2108
- FMA: 49006

In anatomy, the temporalis muscle, also known as the temporal muscle, is one of the muscles of mastication (chewing). It is a broad, fan-shaped convergent muscle on each side of the head that fills the temporal fossa, superior to the zygomatic arch so it covers much of the temporal bone. Temporal refers to the head's temples.

== Structure ==
In humans, the temporalis muscle arises from the temporal fossa and the deep part of temporal fascia. This is a very broad area of attachment. It passes medial to the zygomatic arch. It forms a tendon which inserts onto the coronoid process of the mandible, with its insertion extending into the retromolar fossa posterior to the most distal mandibular molar. In other mammals, the muscle usually spans the dorsal part of the skull all the way up to the medial line. There, it may be attached to a sagittal crest, as can be seen in early hominins such as Paranthropus aethiopicus.

The temporalis muscle is covered by the temporal fascia, also known as the temporal aponeurosis. This fascia is commonly used in tympanoplasty, or surgical reconstruction of the eardrum.

The temporalis muscle is accessible on the temples, and can be seen and felt contracting while the jaw is clenching and unclenching.

=== Blood supply ===
The muscle receives its blood supply from the deep temporal arteries which anastomose with the middle temporal artery.

=== Nerve supply ===
As with the other muscles of mastication, control of the temporal muscle comes from the third (mandibular) branch of the trigeminal nerve. Specifically, the muscle is supplied by the deep temporal nerves. At least 6 smaller branches recruit muscle fibres the most when each has the maximal leverage.

=== Development ===
The temporalis muscle is derived from the first pharyngeal arch in development.

=== Variation ===
The temporalis muscle has a complex structure. Sarcomeres are a consistent length, but larger muscle fibres vary in length in the muscle and between people.

== Function ==
The temporalis muscle is a powerful muscle of the temporomandibular joint. The temporalis muscle can be divided into two functional parts; anterior and posterior. The anterior portion runs vertically and its contraction results in elevation of the mandible (closing the mouth). The posterior portion has fibers which run horizontally and contraction of this portion results in retrusion of the mandible. The middle portion which fibers run in an oblique direction towards inferior and anterior are used for both elevation and retraction of the mandible and in a unilateral contraction provoke lateral movement of the mandible. Motor units are recruited the most when they have the maximal leverage, maximising contractile strength.

When lower dentures are fitted, they should not extend into the retromolar fossa to prevent trauma of the mucosa due to the contraction of the temporalis muscle.

== Clinical significance ==
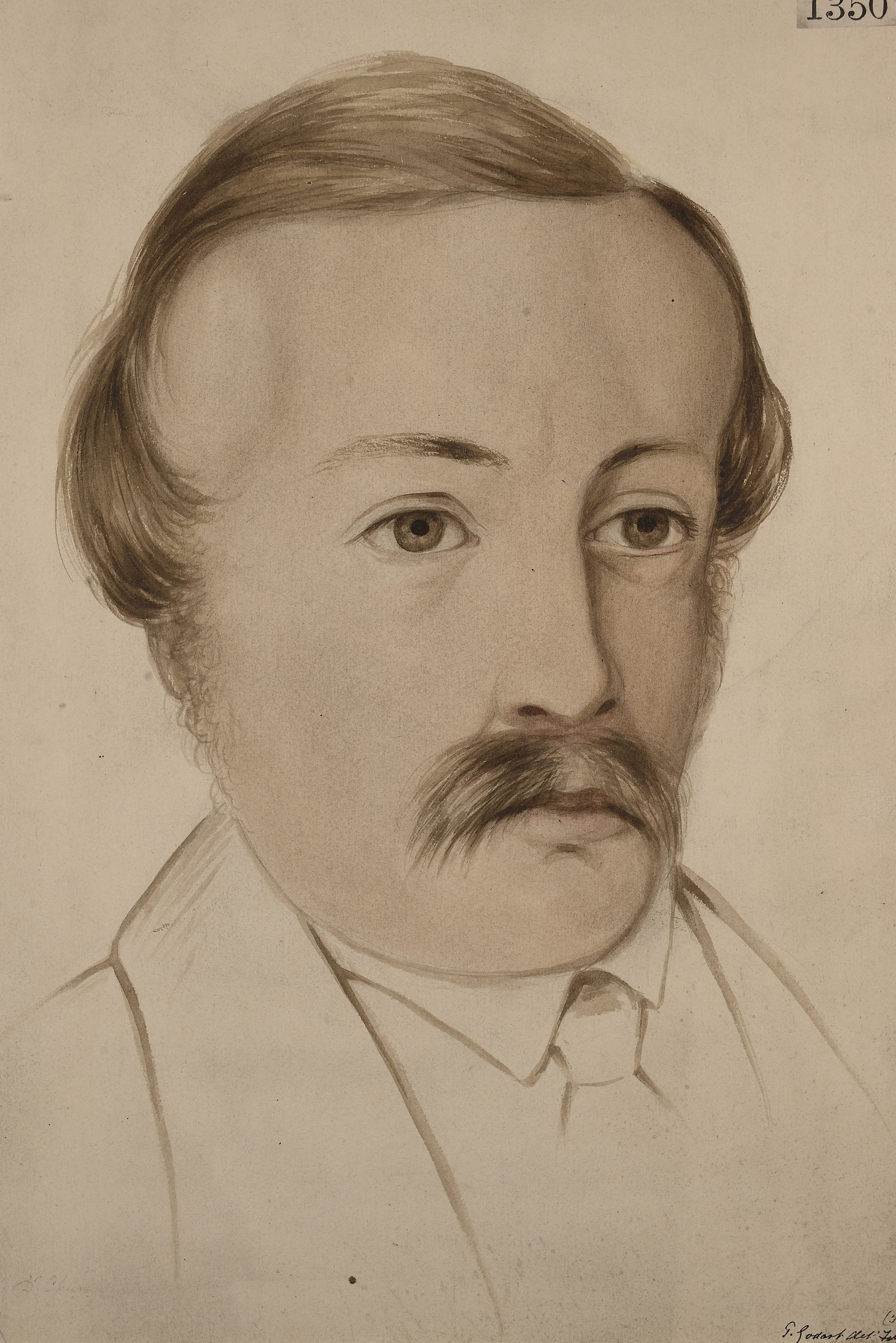
Hypertrophied temporal muscles

The temporalis muscle is likely to be involved in jaw pain and headaches. Bruxism, the habitual grinding of teeth typically while sleeping, and clenching of the jaw while stressed can lead to overwork of the temporalis muscle and results in pain.

=== Seizure ===
A myotendinous rupture of the temporalis muscle can occur during a seizure due to extreme clenching of the jaw. During a seizure, the contralateral temporalis muscle can enter spastic paralysis, this clenching in extreme cases can lead to a rupture specifically on the myotendinous insertion at the coronoid process of the mandible.

=== Surgery ===
The temporalis muscle may be used in reconstructive surgery of the mouth.

During pterional craniotomy, incisions are often chosen based on the ease of reattaching the temporalis muscle after the bone fragment is replaced.

== Additional images ==
Temporal muscle (red).

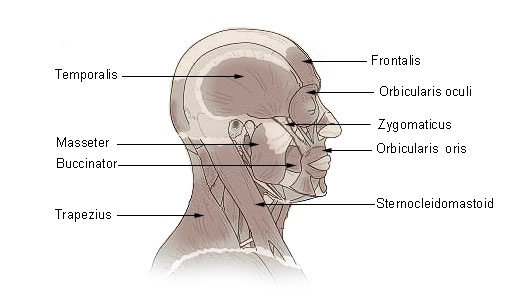
Muscles of head and neck

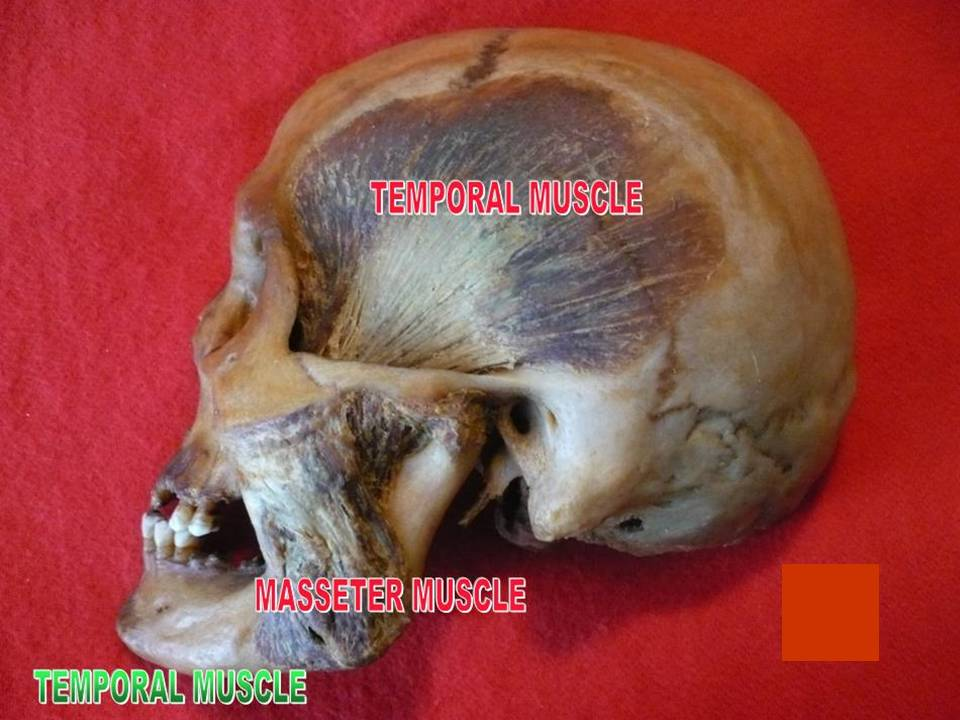
Temporal muscle. Deep dissection. Mummification process.
