= Lateral pterygoid muscle =

Muscle of mastication

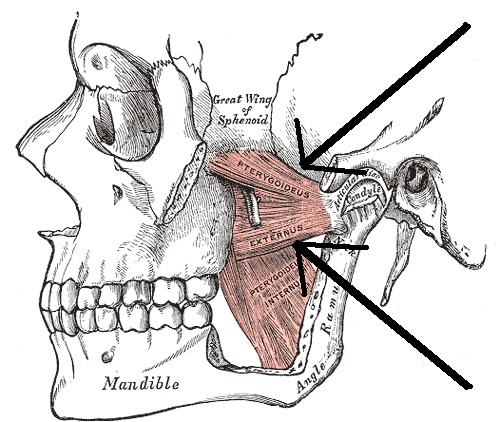
- The Pterygoidei; the zygomatic arch and a portion of the ramus of the mandible have been removed (labeled as "pterygoideus externus", visible in pink at center)

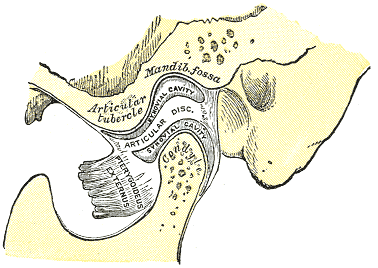
- Sagittal section of the temporomandibular joint (labeled as "pterygoideus externus", visible in gray at bottom left)

Details
- Origin: Superior head: infratemporal surface of sphenoid bone. Inferior head: lateral pterygoid plate
- Insertion: Superior head: anterior side of the mandibular condyle. Inferior head: pterygoid fovea
- Artery: Pterygoid branches of maxillary artery
- Nerve: Lateral pterygoid nerve from mandibular nerve
- Actions: Depresses and protrudes mandible, side to side movement of mandible

Identifiers
- Latin: musculus pterygoideus lateralis, musculus pterygoideus externus
- TA98: A04.1.04.006
- TA2: 2109
- FMA: 49015

The lateral pterygoid muscle (or external pterygoid muscle) is a muscle of mastication. It has two heads. It lies superior to the medial pterygoid muscle. It is supplied by pterygoid branches of the maxillary artery, and the lateral pterygoid nerve (from the mandibular nerve, CN V_{3}). It depresses and protrudes the mandible. When each muscle works independently, they can move the mandible side to side.

== Structure ==
The lateral pterygoid muscle has an upper head and a lower head.

- The upper head originates on the infratemporal surface and infratemporal crest of the greater wing of the sphenoid bone. It inserts onto the articular disc and fibrous capsule of the temporomandibular joint.
- The lower head originates on the lateral surface of the lateral pterygoid plate. It inserts onto the pterygoid fovea at the neck of the condyloid process of the mandible.

It lies superior to the medial pterygoid muscle.

=== Blood supply ===
The lateral pterygoid muscle is supplied by pterygoid branches of the maxillary artery.

=== Nerve supply ===
The lateral pterygoid muscle is supplied by the lateral pterygoid nerve, a branch of the mandibular nerve (CN V_{3}), itself a branch of the trigeminal nerve (CN V).

== Function ==
The primary function of the lateral pterygoid muscle is to pull the head of the condyle out of the mandibular fossa along the articular eminence to protrude the mandible. A concerted effort of the lateral pterygoid muscles helps in lowering the mandible and opening the jaw. Unilateral action of a lateral pterygoid muscle causes contralateral excursion (a form of mastication), usually performed in concert with the medial pterygoids. When they work independently, they can move the mandible side to side.

Unlike the other three muscles of mastication, the lateral pterygoid alone can assist in depressing the mandible (opening the jaw). At the beginning of this action it is assisted by the digastric, mylohyoid and geniohyoid muscles.

== Clinical significance ==
The lateral pterygoid muscle may be involved in temporomandibular joint dysfunction.

== Additional images ==
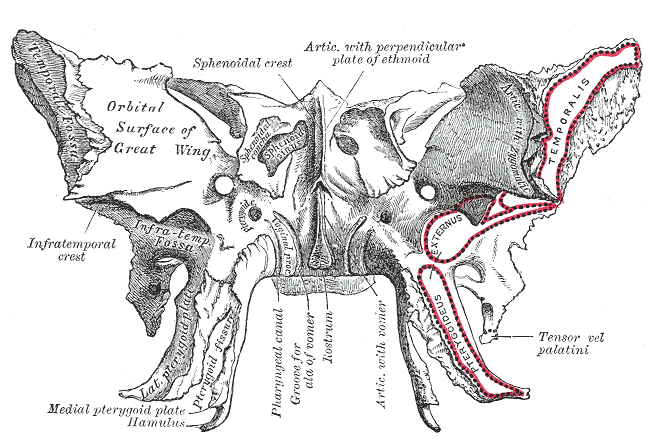
Sphenoid bone. Anterior and inferior surfaces.

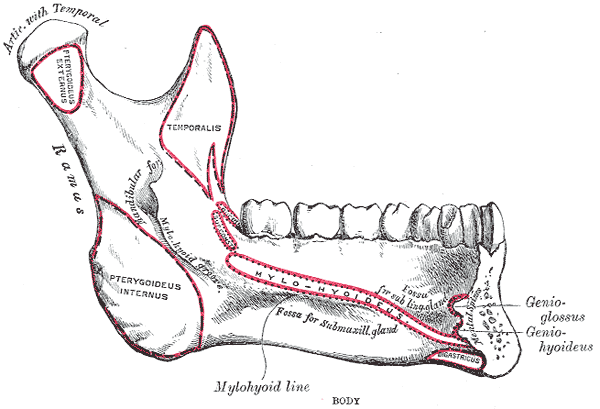
Mandible. Inner surface. Side view.

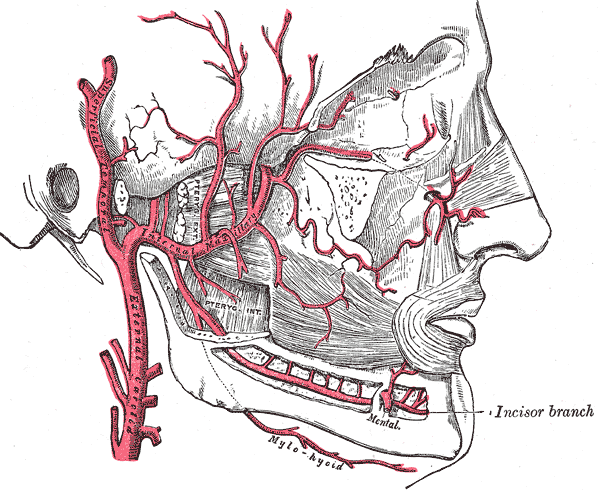
Plan of branches of internal maxillary artery.

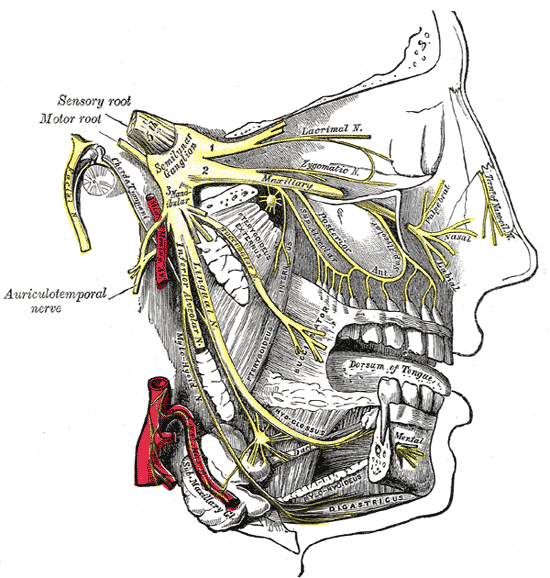
Distribution of the maxillary and mandibular nerves, and the submaxillary ganglion.
