= Zygomaticomaxillary complex fracture =

ZMC complex fracture
- Other names: Quadripod fracture
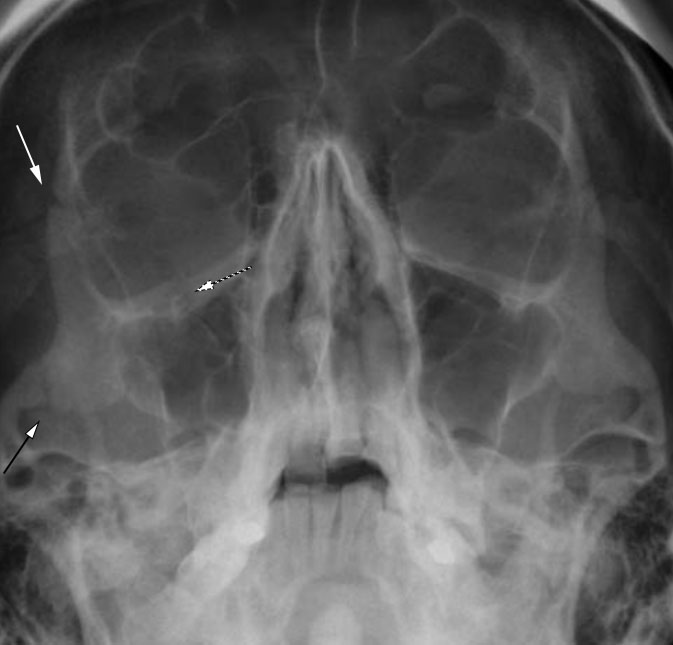
- Right zygomaticomaxillary complex fracture with disruption of the lateral orbital wall, orbital floor, zygomatic arch and maxillary sinus.

The zygomaticomaxillary complex fracture, also known as a quadripod fracture, quadramalar fracture, and formerly referred to as a tripod fracture or trimalar fracture, has four components, three of which are directly related to connections between the zygoma and the face, and the fourth being the orbital floor. Its specific locations are the lateral orbital wall (at its superior junction with the zygomaticofrontal suture or its inferior junction with the zygomaticosphenoid suture at the sphenoid greater wing), separation of the maxilla and zygoma at the anterior maxilla (near the zygomaticomaxillary suture), the zygomatic arch, and the orbital floor near the infraorbital canal.

== Signs and symptoms ==
On physical exam, the fracture appears as a loss of cheek projection with increased width of the face. In most cases, there is loss of sensation in the cheek and upper lip due to infraorbital nerve injury. Facial bruising, periorbital ecchymosis, soft tissue gas, swelling, trismus, altered mastication, diplopia, and ophthalmoplegia are other indirect features of the injury. The zygomatic arch usually fractures at its weakest point, 1.5 cm behind the zygomaticotemporal suture.

== Cause ==
The cause is usually a direct blow to the malar eminence of the cheek during assault. The paired zygomas each have two attachments to the cranium, and two attachments to the maxilla, making up the orbital floors and lateral walls. These complexes are referred to as the zygomaticomaxillary complex. The upper and transverse maxillary bone has the zygomaticomaxillary and zygomaticotemporal sutures, while the lateral and vertical maxillary bone has the zygomaticomaxillary and frontozygomatic sutures.

The formerly used 'tripod fracture' refers to these buttresses, but did not also incorporate the posterior relationship of the zygoma to the sphenoid bone at the zygomaticosphenoid suture.

There is an association of ZMC fractures with naso-orbito-ethmoidal fractures (NOE) on the same side as the injury. Concomitant NOE fractures predict a higher incidence of post operative deformity.

== Components ==
ZMC complex fractures involve the lateral vertical buttress of the ZMC complex (lateral maxillary sinus and lateral orbital wall) and the upper transverse buttress (inferior orbital rim and floor, also including the zygomatic arch). Three of its four components are directly related to connections between the zygoma and the face.

Two of its components are connections between the orbit and mid-face at the orbital medial wall and floor. Unlike an orbital blow out fracture, however, the orbital rim can be involved. The posterior vertical buttress is usually spared, and is more commonly involved in Lefort fractures.

Specifically, one of two positions at the lateral orbital wall can be involved, either above at its superior junction with the zygomaticofrontal suture or below at its inferior junction with the zygomaticosphenoid suture at the sphenoid greater wing. Separation of the maxilla and zygoma at the anterior maxilla is also seen near the zygomaticomaxillary suture. The zygomatic arch itself is also transcortically involved, and the orbital floor near the infraorbital canal is disrupted.

== Treatment ==
Non-displaced or minimally displaced fractures may be treated conservatively. Open reduction and internal fixation is reserved for cases that are severely angulated or comminuted. The purpose of fixation is to restore the normal appearance of the face. Specific attention is given to the position of the malar eminence and reduction of orbital volume by realigning the zygoma and sphenoid. Failure to correct can result in rotational deformity and increase the volume of the orbit, causing the eye to sink inwards.

Fractures with displacement require surgery consisting of fracture reduction with miniplates, microplates and screws. Gillie's approach is used for depressed zygomatic fractures. The prognosis of tripod fractures is generally good. In some cases there may be persistent post-surgical facial asymmetry, which can require further treatment.
