= Synarthrosis =

Immobile joint type

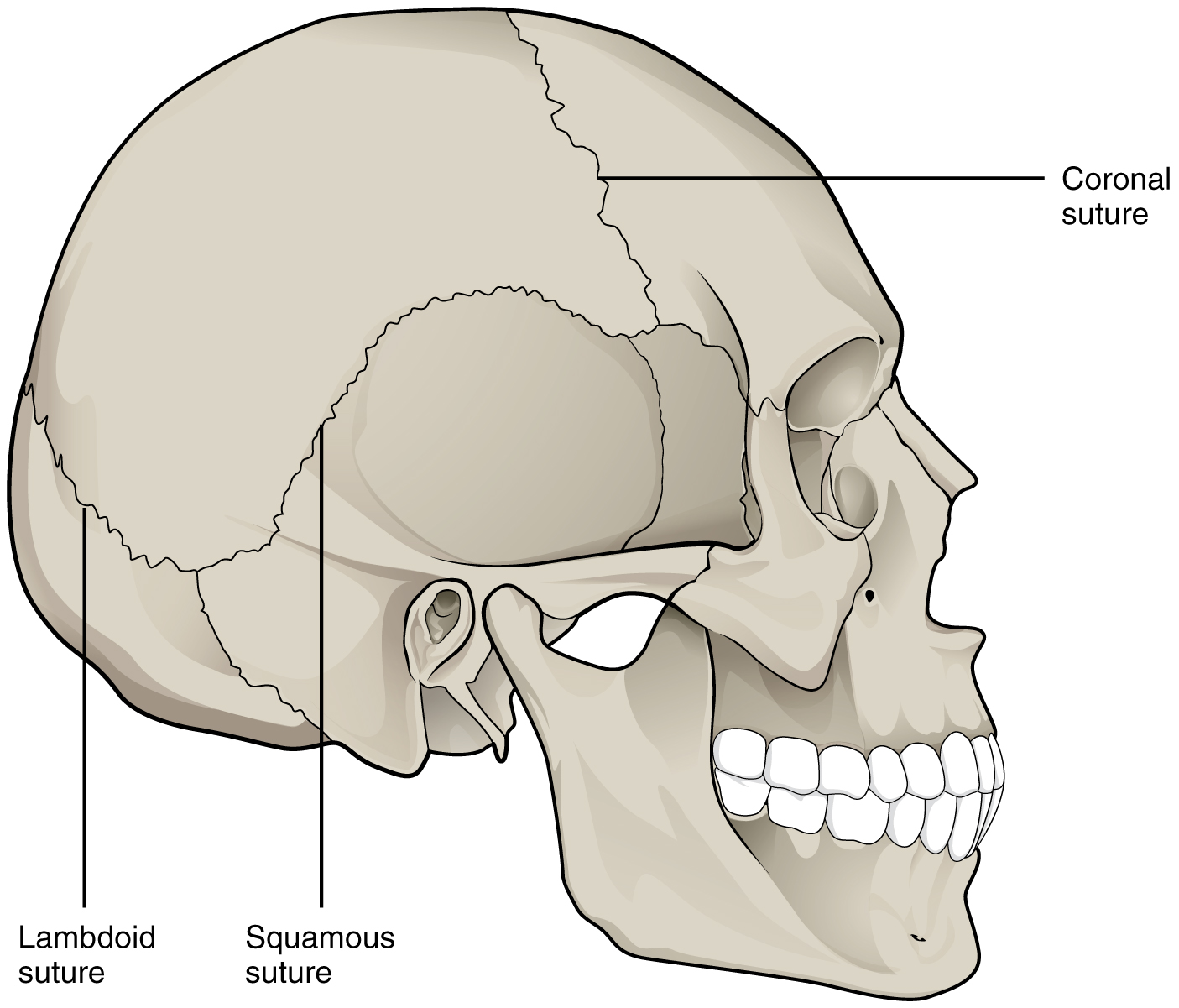
- The suture joints of the skull are an example of a synarthrosis.

Identifiers
- TA98: A03.0.00.003
- TA2: 1550
- FMA: 7491

A synarthrosis is a type of joint which allows no movement under normal conditions. Sutures and gomphoses are both synarthroses. Joints which allow more movement are called amphiarthroses or diarthroses. Syndesmoses are considered to be amphiarthrotic, because they allow a small amount of movement.

== Types ==
They can be categorised by how the bones are joined together:

- Gomphosis is the type of joint in which a conical peg fits into a socket, for example, the socket of a tooth. Normally, there is very little movement of the teeth in the mandible or maxilla.
- Synostosis is where two bones that are initially separated eventually fuse, essentially becoming one bone. In humans, as in other animals, the plates of the cranium fuse with dense fibrous connective tissue as a child approaches adulthood. Children whose cranial plates fuse too early may suffer deformities and brain damage as the skull does not expand properly to accommodate the growing brain, a condition known as craniosynostosis.
- Synchondrosis is a cartilaginous joint connected by hyaline cartilage, as seen in the epiphyseal plate.

== Characteristics ==
The articulating surfaces of synarthroses have little or no mobility, and are strongly united to each other. For example, most of the joints of the skull are held together by fibrous connective tissue and do not allow for movement between the adjacent bones. This lack of mobility is important, because the skull bones serve to protect the brain.
