= Fibrous joint =

Fixed joints between bones held together by dense, fibrous tissue

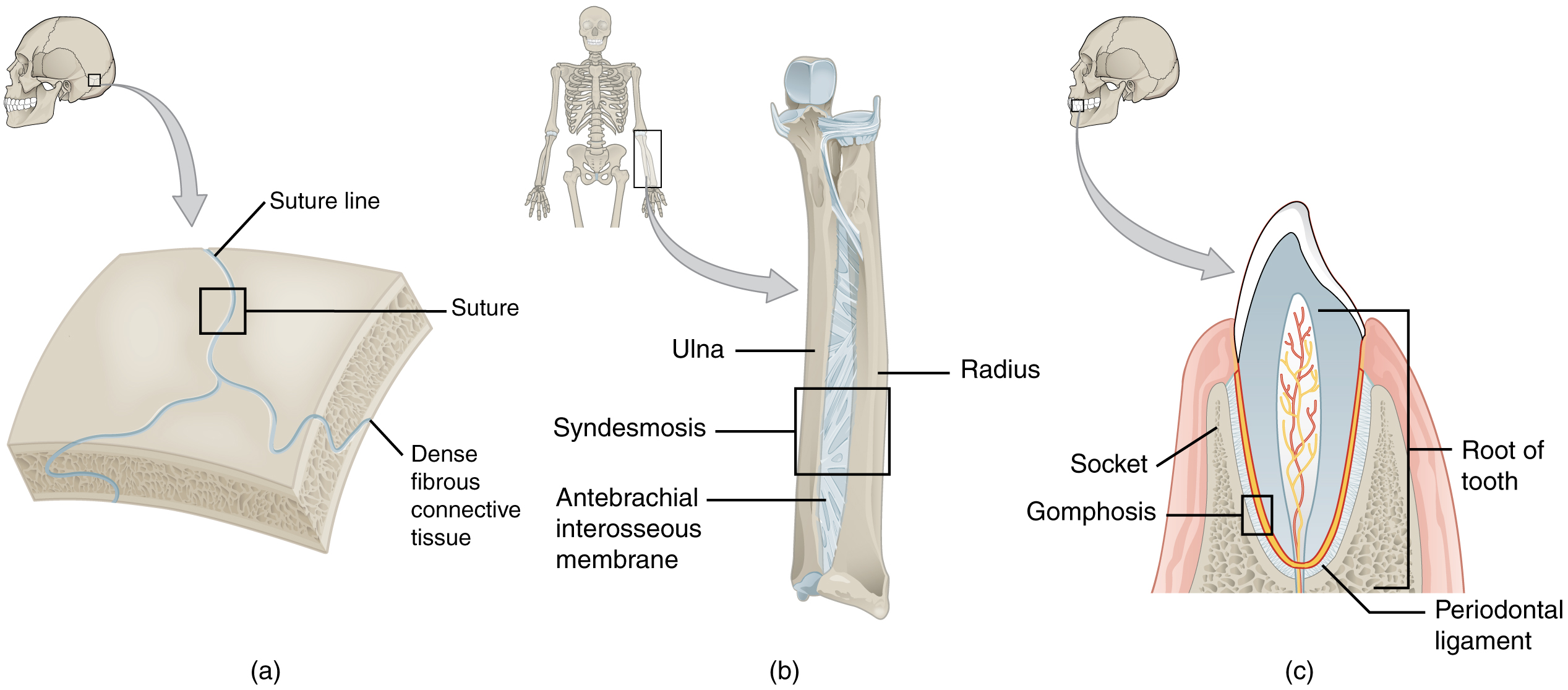
- Fibrous joints

Details

Identifiers
- Latin: articulatio fibrosa, junctura fibrosa
- TA98: A03.0.00.004
- TA2: 1517
- FMA: 7492

In anatomy, fibrous joints are joints connected by fibrous tissue, consisting mainly of collagen. These are fixed joints where bones are united by a layer of white fibrous tissue of varying thickness. In the skull, the joints between the bones are called sutures. Such immovable joints are also referred to as synarthroses.

== Types ==
Most fibrous joints are also called "fixed" or "immovable". These joints have no joint cavity and are connected via fibrous connective tissue.

- Sutures: The skull bones are connected by fibrous joints called sutures. In fetal skulls, the sutures are wide to allow slight movement during birth. They later become rigid (synarthrodial).
- Syndesmosis: Some of the long bones in the body such as the radius and ulna in the forearm are joined by a syndesmosis (along the interosseous membrane). Syndemoses are slightly moveable (amphiarthrodial). The distal tibiofibular joint is another example.
- A gomphosis is a joint between the root of a tooth and the socket in the maxilla or mandible (jawbones).

== Sutures ==
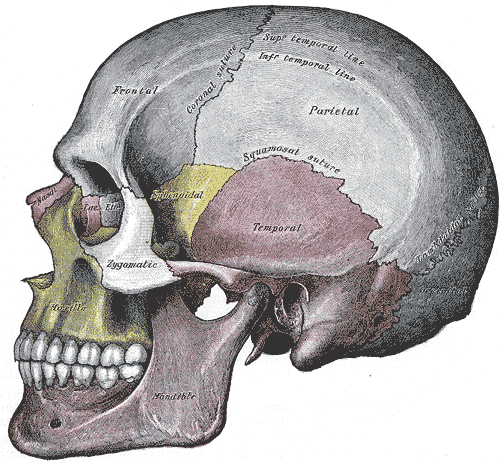
Side view of the skull

Human skull side sutures right

A suture is a type of fibrous joint that is only found in the skull (cranial suture). The bones are bound together by Sharpey's fibres. A tiny amount of movement is permitted at sutures, which contributes to the compliance and elasticity of the skull. These joints are synarthroses. It is normal for many of the bones of the skull to remain unfused at birth. The fusion of the skull's bones before birth is known as craniosynostosis. The term "fontanelle" is used to describe the resulting "soft spots". The relative positions of the bones continue to change during the life of the adult (though less rapidly), which can provide useful information in forensics and archaeology. In old age, cranial sutures may ossify (turn to bone) completely. The joints between the teeth and jaws (gomphoses) and the joint between the mandible and the cranium, the temporomandibular joint, form the only non-sutured joints in the skull.

=== Types of sutures ===
- Serrate sutures – similar to a denticulate suture but the interlocking regions are serrated rather than square. Eg: Coronal suture, sagittal Sutures.
- Plane sutures – edges of the bones are flush with each other as in a normal butt joint. Eg: Internasal suture.
- Limbous sutures – edges are bevelled so the plane of the suture is sloping as in a mitre joint. Eg: Temporo-parietal suture.
- Schindylesis – formed by two bones fitting into each other similar to a bridle joint. Eg: Palatomaxillary suture.
- Denticulate sutures – the edges slot into each other as in a finger joint. Eg: Lambdoid suture.

=== List of sutures ===
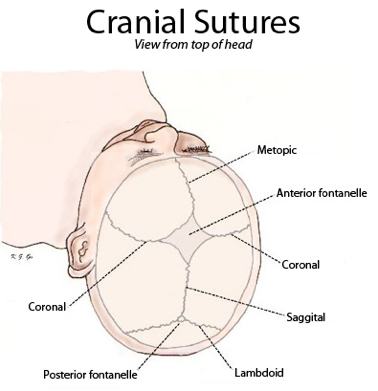
Cranial sutures viewed from top of head

Most sutures are named for the bones they articulate, but some have special names of their own.

==== Visible from the side ====
- Coronal suture – between the frontal and parietal bones
- Lambdoid suture – between the parietal and occipital bones and continuous with the occipitomastoid suture
- Occipitomastoid suture – between the occipital and temporal bones and continuous with the lambdoid suture
- Sphenofrontal suture
- Sphenoparietal suture
- Sphenosquamosal suture
- Sphenozygomatic suture
- Squamosal suture – between the parietal and the temporal bone
- Zygomaticotemporal suture
- Zygomaticofrontal suture

==== Visible from the front or above ====
- Frontal suture / Metopic suture – between the two frontal bones, prior to the fusion of the two into a single bone
- Sagittal suture – along the midline, between parietal bones

==== Visible from below or inside ====
- Frontoethmoidal suture
- Petrosquamous suture
- Sphenoethmoidal suture
- Sphenopetrosal suture

=== Gallery ===
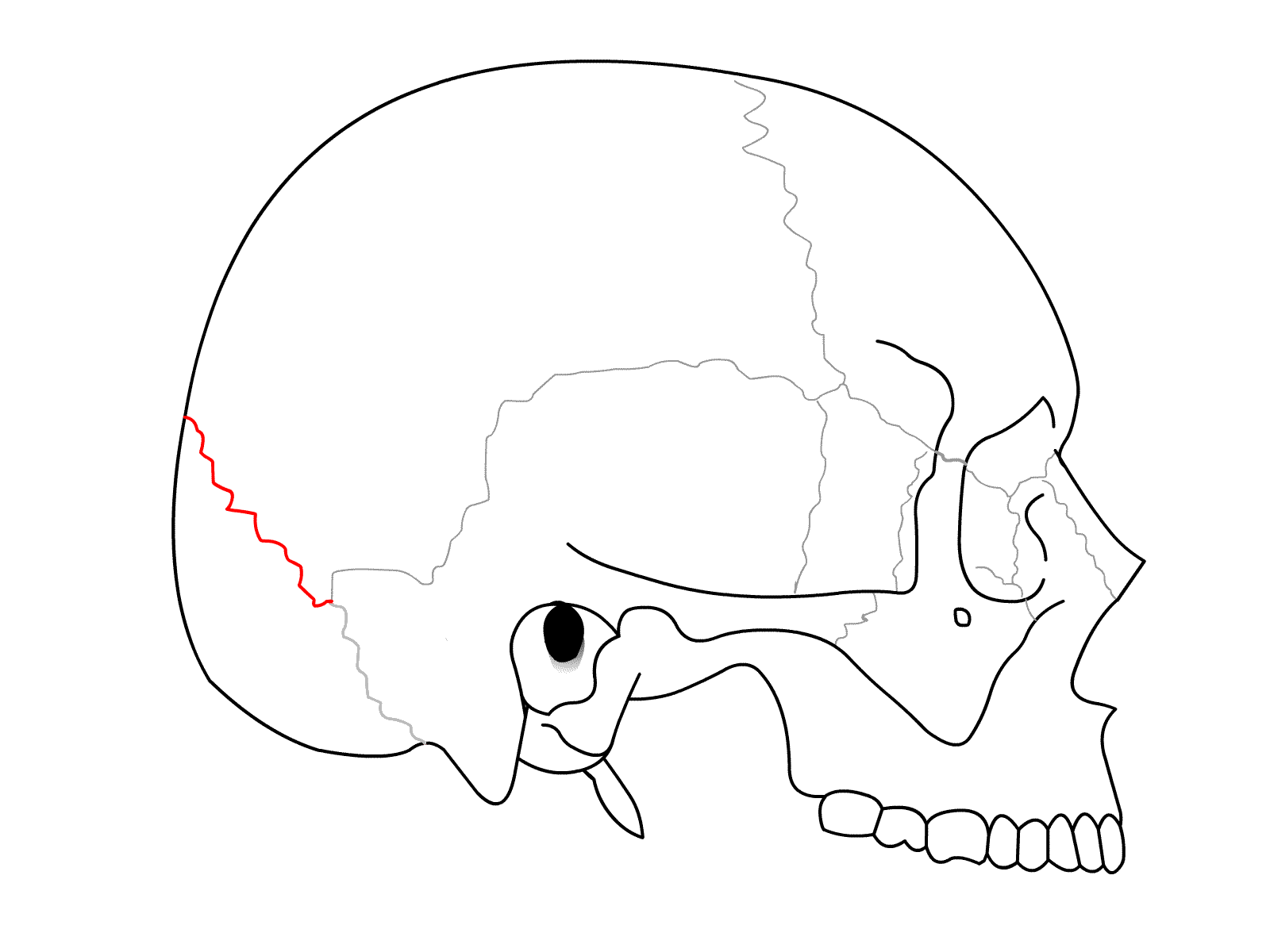
Lambdoid suture

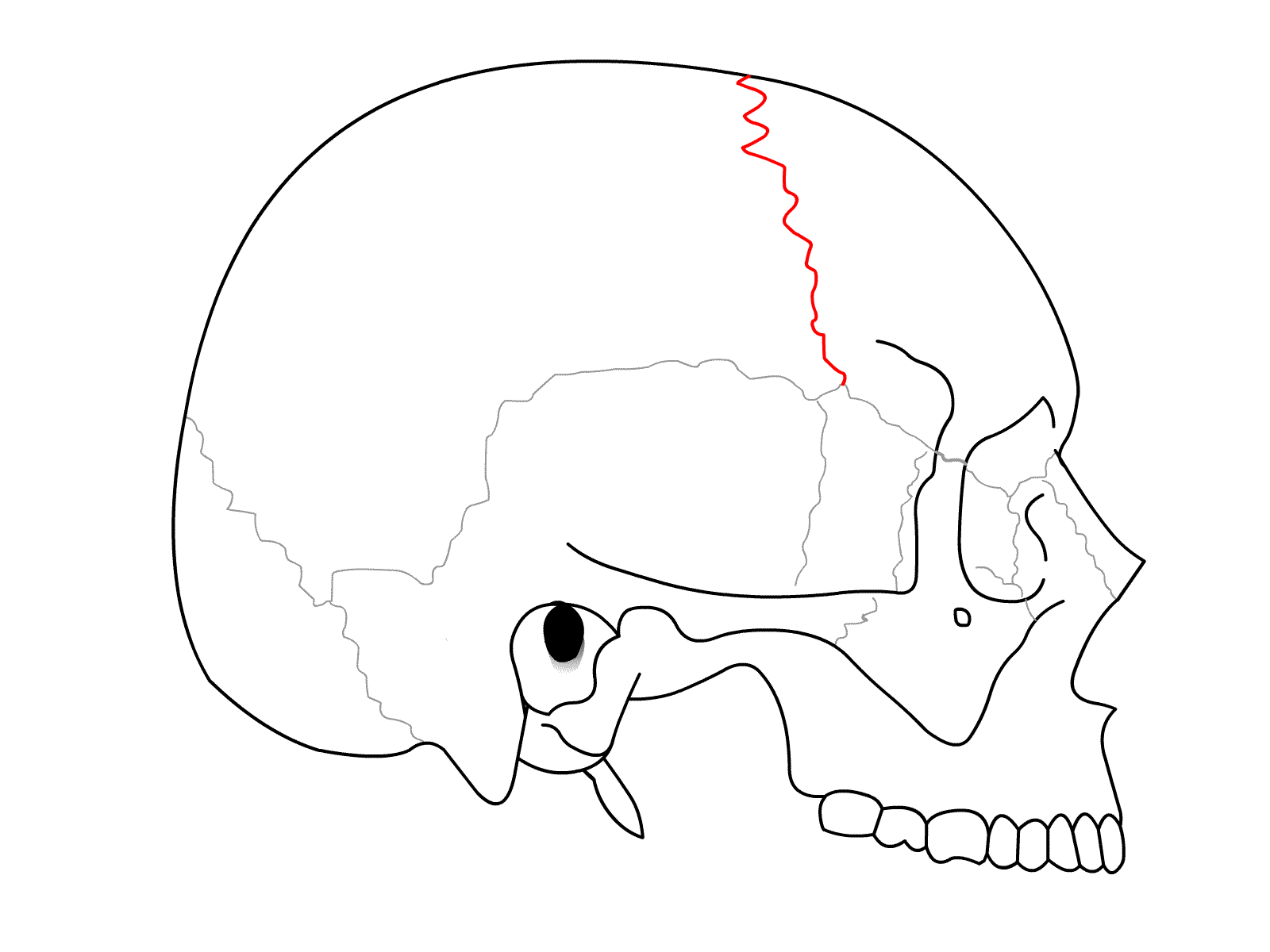
Coronal suture

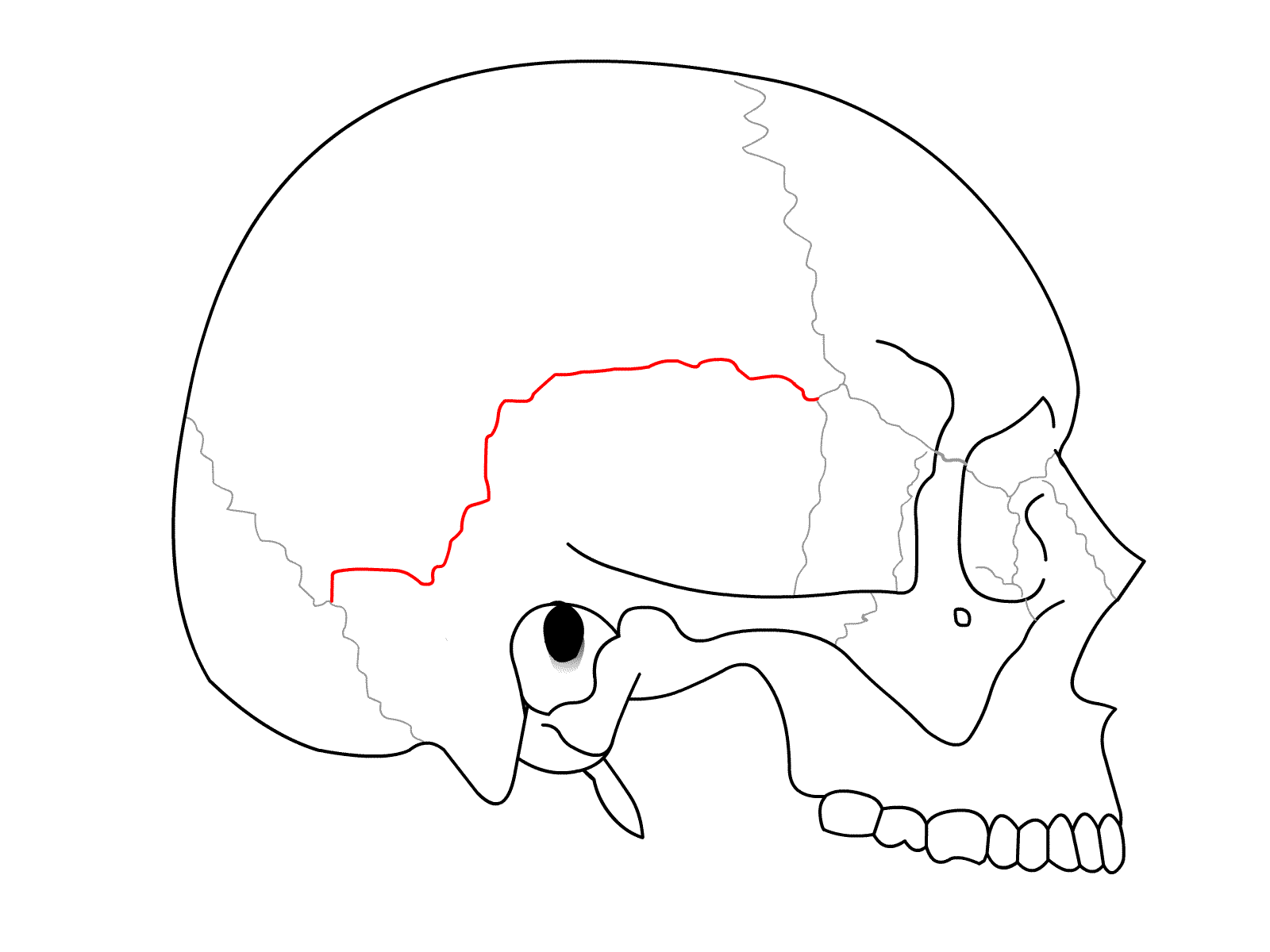
Squamosal suture

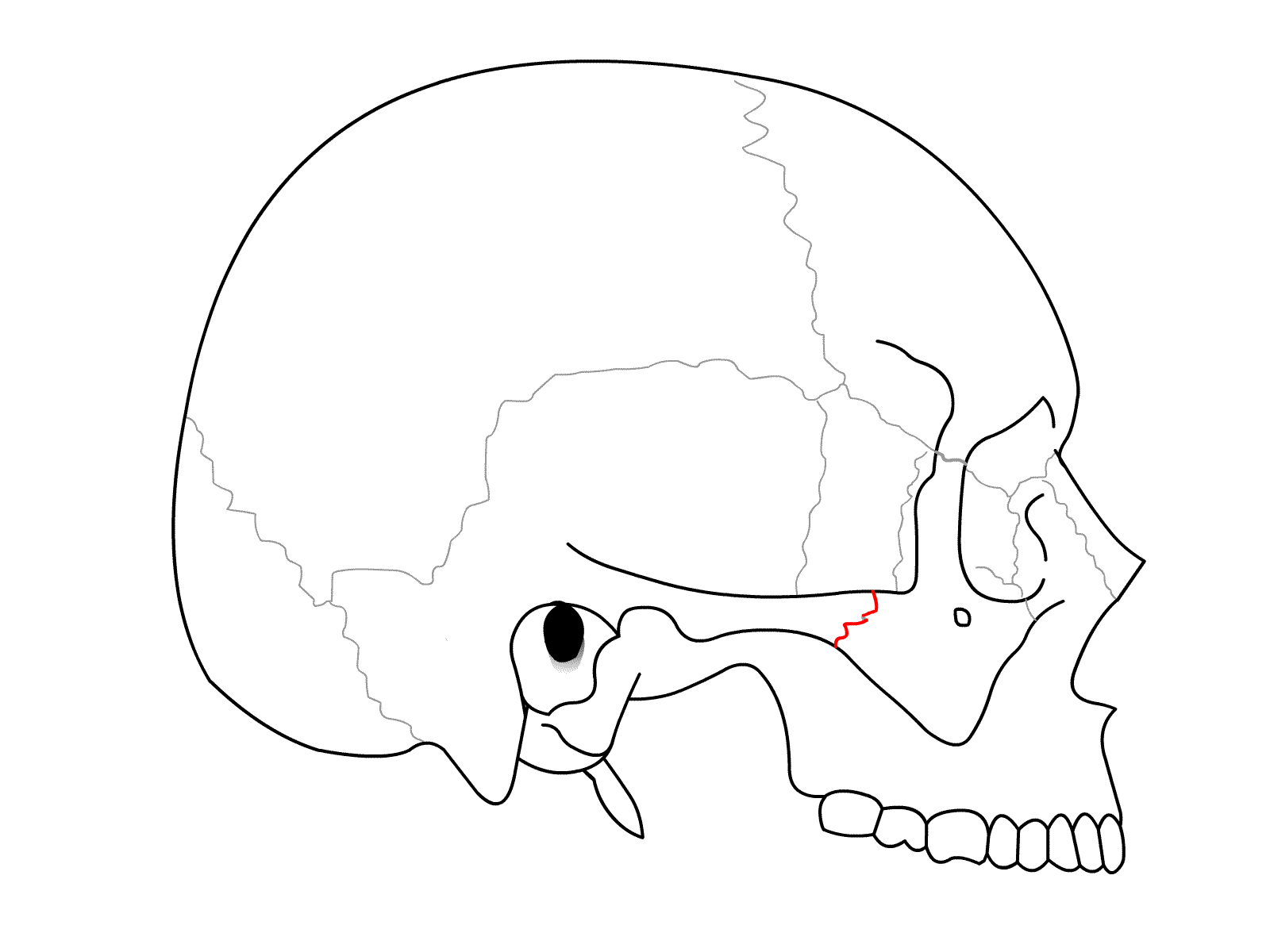
Zygomaticotemporal suture

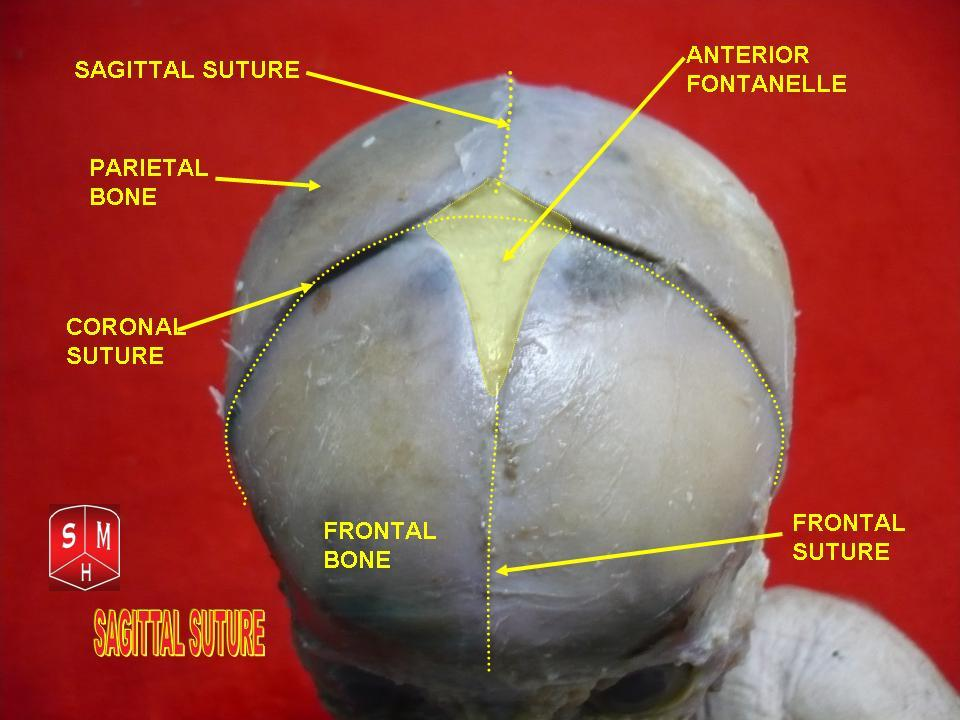
Sagittal suture.

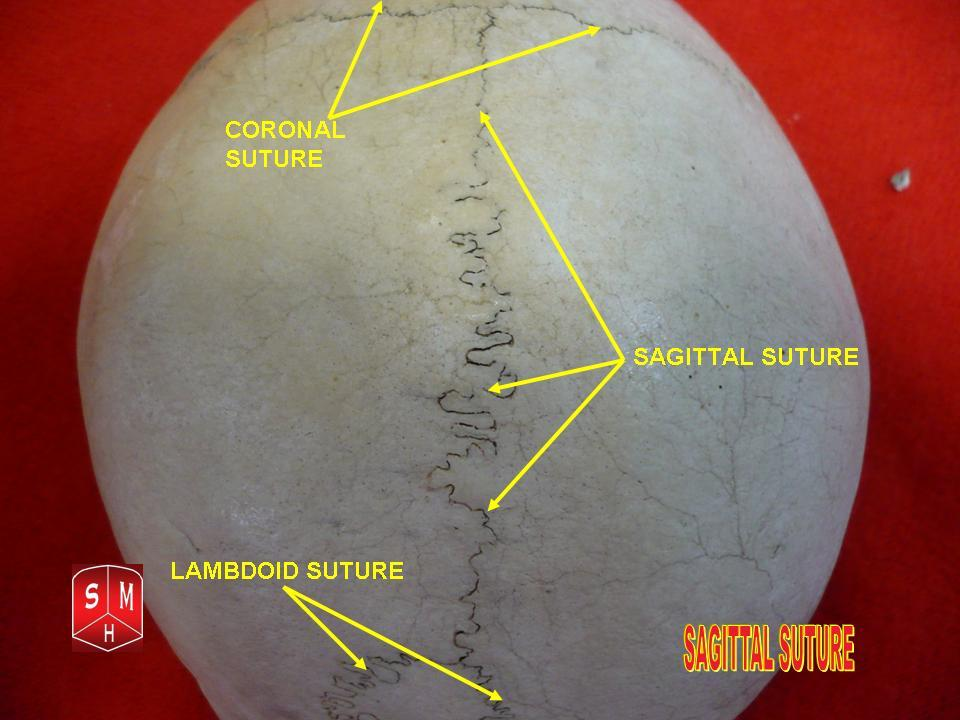
Sagittal suture.

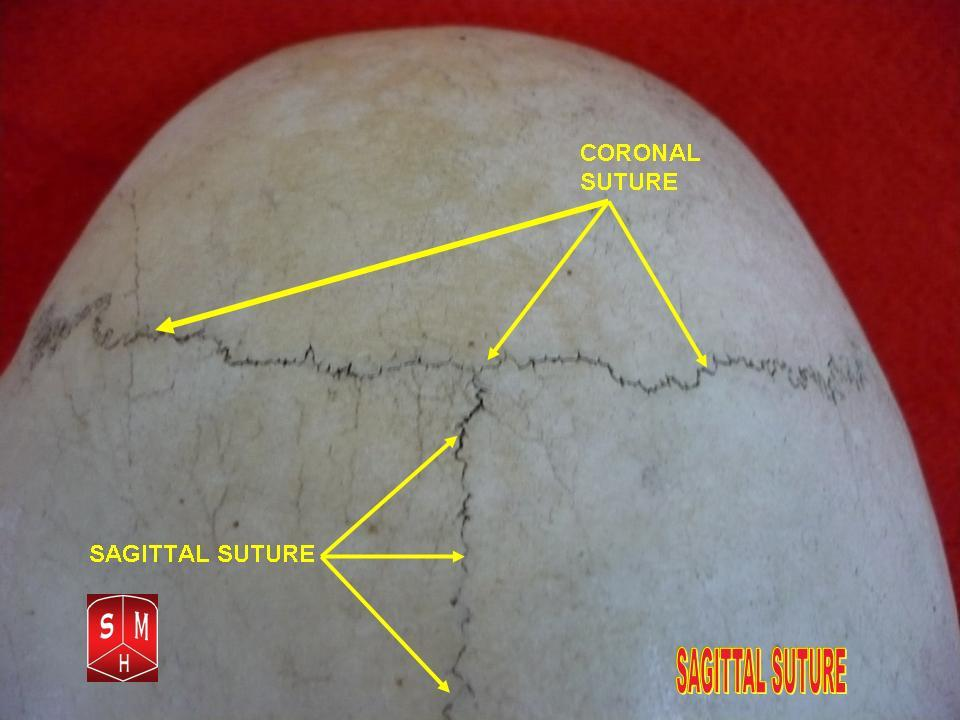
Sagittal suture.

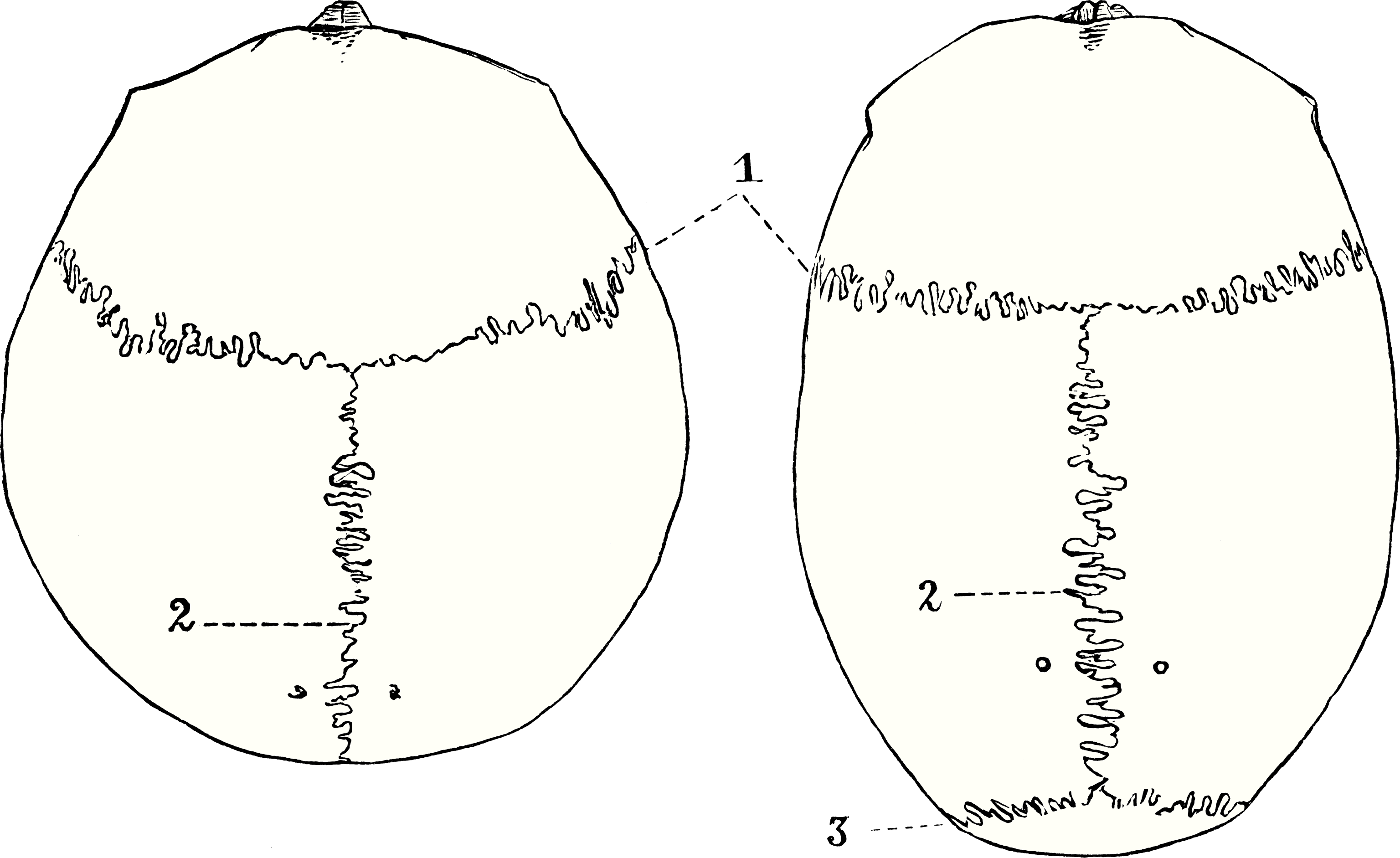
Top view of cranial suture.

== Syndesmosis ==
A syndesmosis is a slightly mobile fibrous joint in which bones such as the tibia and fibula are joined together by connective tissue. An example is the distal tibiofibular joint. Injuries to the ankle syndesmosis are commonly known as a "high ankle sprain". Although the syndesmosis is a joint, in the literature the term syndesmotic injury is used to describe injury of the syndesmotic ligaments. It comes from the Greek σύν, syn (meaning "with") and δεσμός, desmos (meaning "a band"). Syndesmosis sprains have received increasing recognition during recent years because of a heightened awareness of the mechanism, symptoms, and signs of injury.

=== Diagnosis of a syndesmotic injury ===
Diagnosis of syndesmosis injuries by physical examination is often straightforward. Physical examination findings that are often positive include the squeeze test and the external rotation test. Patients with high-grade syndesmosis injuries often cannot perform a single-leg heel raise. Patients report pain in varying degrees over the anterior and often posterior distal fibular joint.

=== Syndesmotic tear ===
The severity of acute syndesmosis injury is rated from grade I to III by several authors. A grade I injury is a partial anteroinferior tibiofibular ligament tear, meaning the exorotation and squeeze tests are negative for this grade. Grade II injury is a complete anteroinferior tibiofibular ligament and inferior interosseous ligament tear, meaning that squeeze test and exorotation are positive. This results in the injury being stabilized with immobilization but not operatively stabilized. A grade III injury is a complete anteroinferior tibiofibular ligament tear including a (partial) interosseous ligament tear and deltoid ligament avulsion, meaning the joint is unstable and positive on the exorotation and squeeze tests. This grade requires operative stabilization. If the syndesmosis is torn apart as result of bone fracture, surgeons will sometimes fix the relevant bones together with a syndesmotic screw, temporarily replacing the syndesmosis, or with a tightrope fixation, which is called syndesmosis procedure. The screw inhibits normal movement of the bones and, thereby, the corresponding joint(s). When the natural articulation is healed, the screw may be removed. The tightrope fixation with elastic fiberwire suture on the other hand allows physiologic motion of the ankle and may be permanent.

== Gomphosis ==
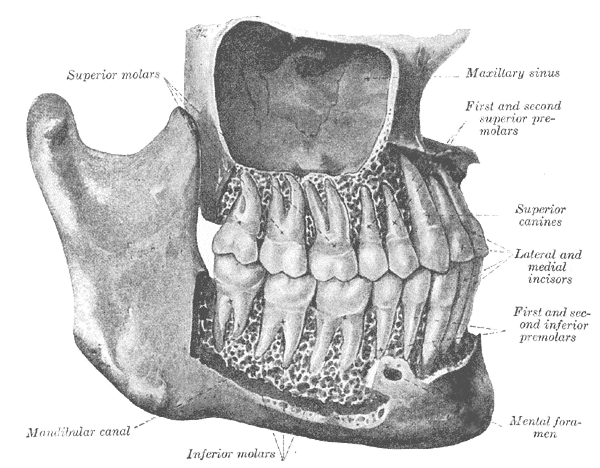
The teeth, viewed from the right

A gomphosis, also known as a dentoalveolar syndesmosis, or 'peg and socket joint' is a joint that binds the teeth to bony teeth sockets in the maxillary bone and mandible. Gomphos is the Greek word for "bolt". The fibrous connection between a tooth and its socket is a periodontal ligament. Specifically, the connection is made between the maxilla or mandible to the cementum of the tooth.

The motion of a gomphosis is minimal, though considerable movement can be achieved over time—the basis of using braces to realign teeth. The joint can be considered a synarthrosis.

The gomphosis is the only joint-type in which a bone does not join another bone, as teeth are not technically bone. In modern, more anatomical, joint classification, the gomphosis is simply considered a fibrous joint because the tissue linking the structures is ligamentous. It has been suggested that this permanent soft-tissue attachment was a critical requisite in the evolution of the mammalian (synapsid) tusk.
