= Syndesmotic screw =

Type of screw

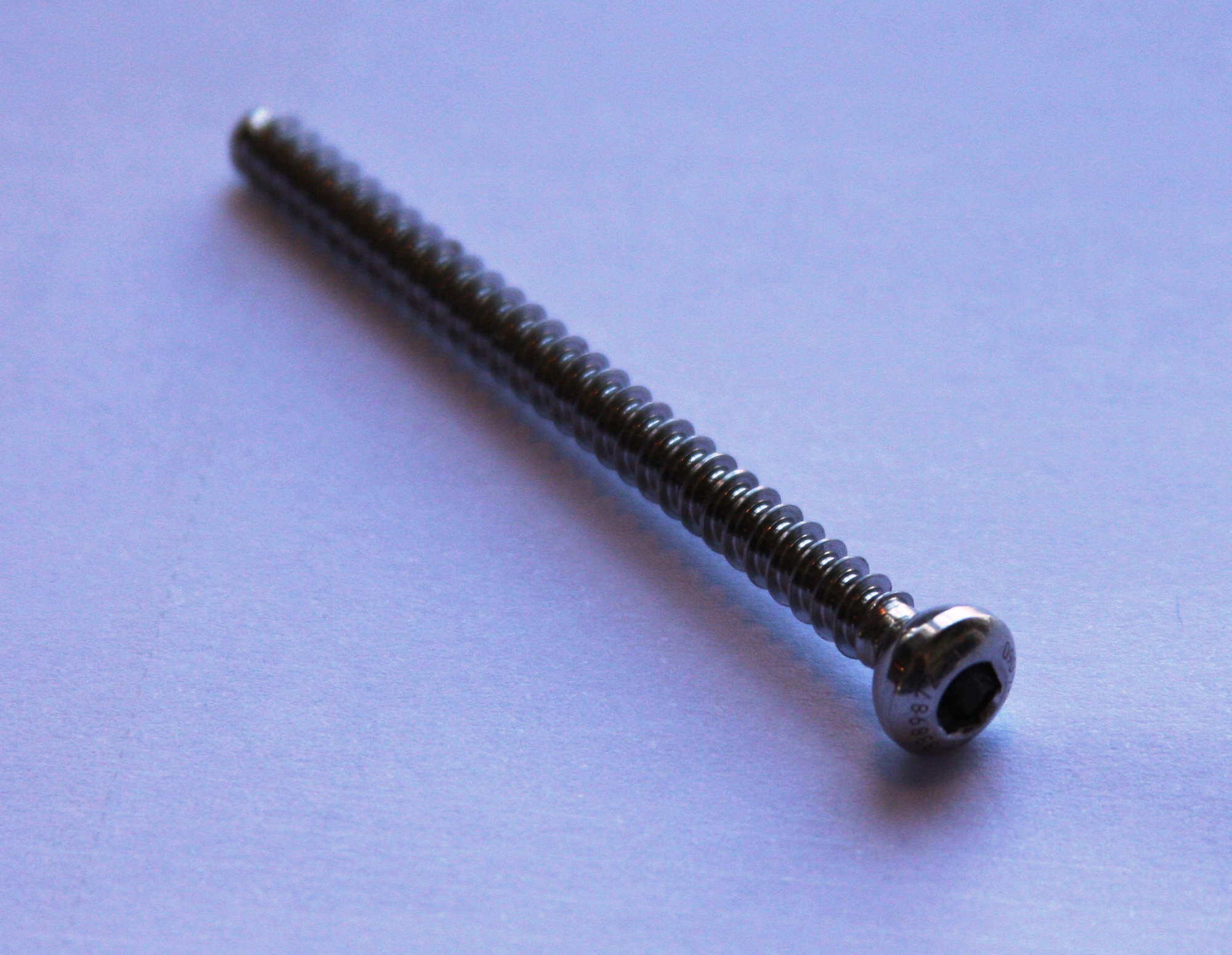
A syndesmotic screw, removed from human tibiofibular position.

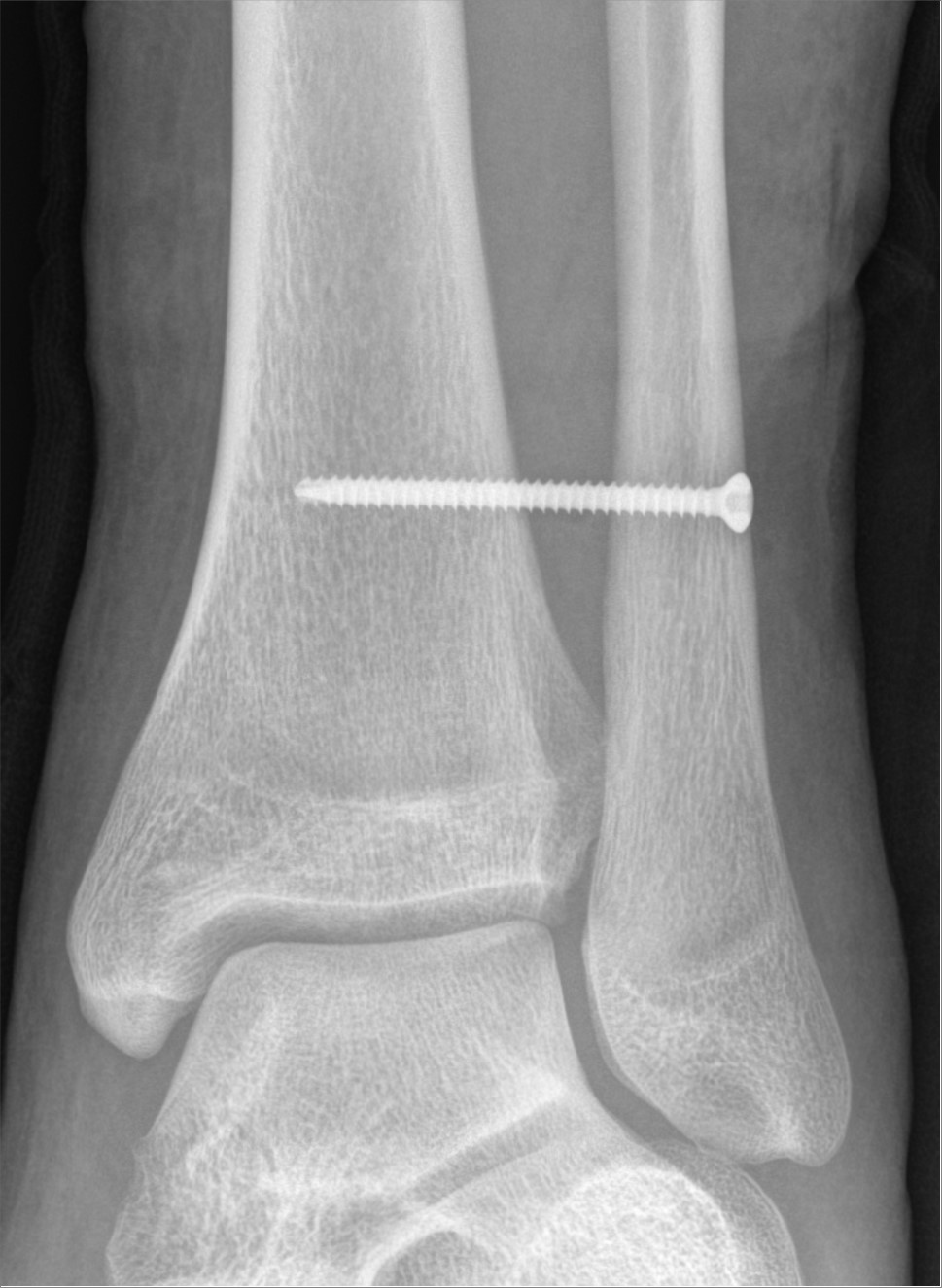
X-ray of a syndesmotic screw in place.

A syndesmotic screw is a metal screw designed to replace the syndesmosis of the human body, usually temporarily. If the syndosmosis is torn apart as result of bone fracture, surgeons will sometimes fix the relevant bones together with a syndesmotic screw, temporarily replacing the normal articulation.

A syndesmotic screw designed to replace the inferior tibiofibular articulation that fix the tibia and fibula together at the lower joint, is 5–6 cm long and made of a stainless, solid metal.

The screw may inhibit normal movement of the bones and, thereby, the corresponding joint(s). When the natural articulation is healed, the screw may be removed.
