= Zygomaticotemporal suture =

Cranial suture between the zygomatic bone and the temporal bone

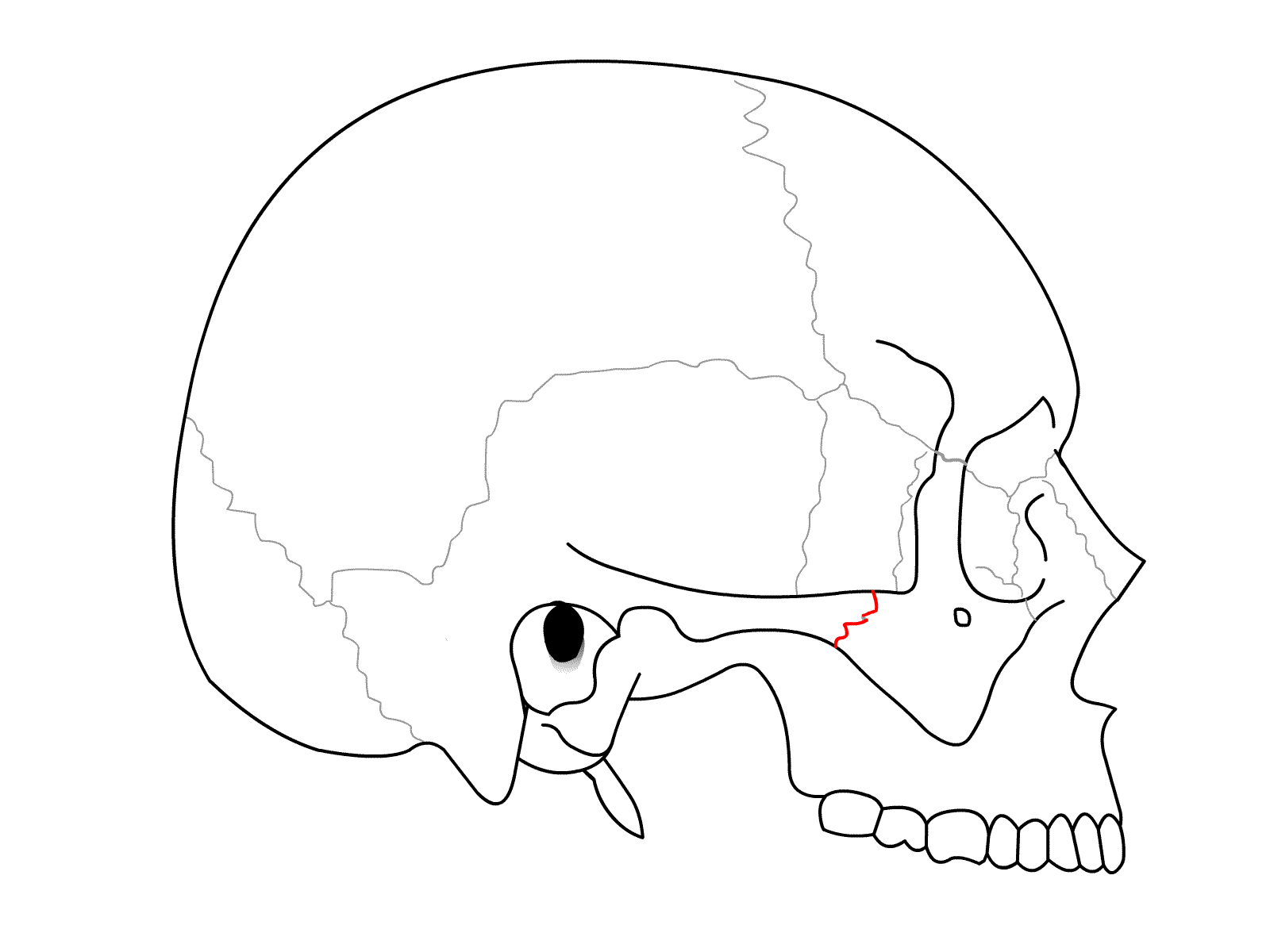
- Zygomaticotemporal suture (red)

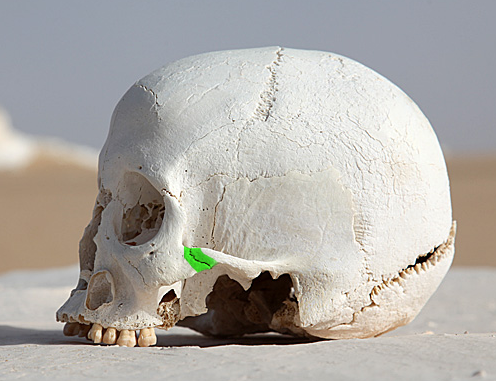
- Zygomaticotemporal suture (green)

Details

Identifiers
- Latin: sutura temporozygomatica
- TA98: A03.1.02.024
- TA2: 1599
- FMA: 52958

The zygomaticotemporal suture (or temporozygomatic suture) is the cranial suture between the zygomatic bone and the temporal bone. This is part of the zygomatic arch. Movement at the suture decreases with development during aging. It has a complex internal structure.

== Additional images ==
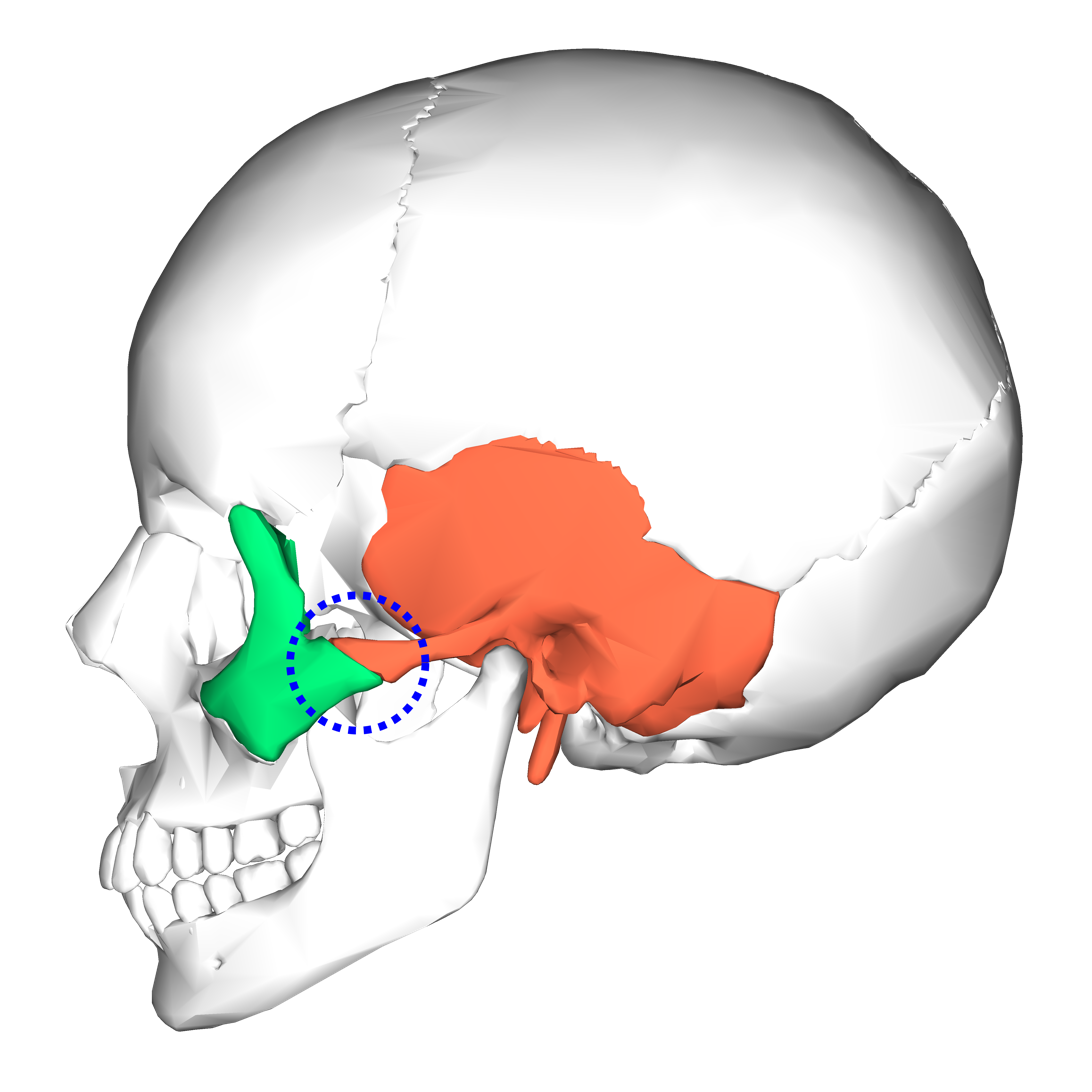
Zygomaticotemporal suture (blue circle) and position of two bones.
Zygomatic bone
Temporal bone

Position of zygomaticotemporal suture (red). Animation.

Cross section (temporal bones removed). Animation.

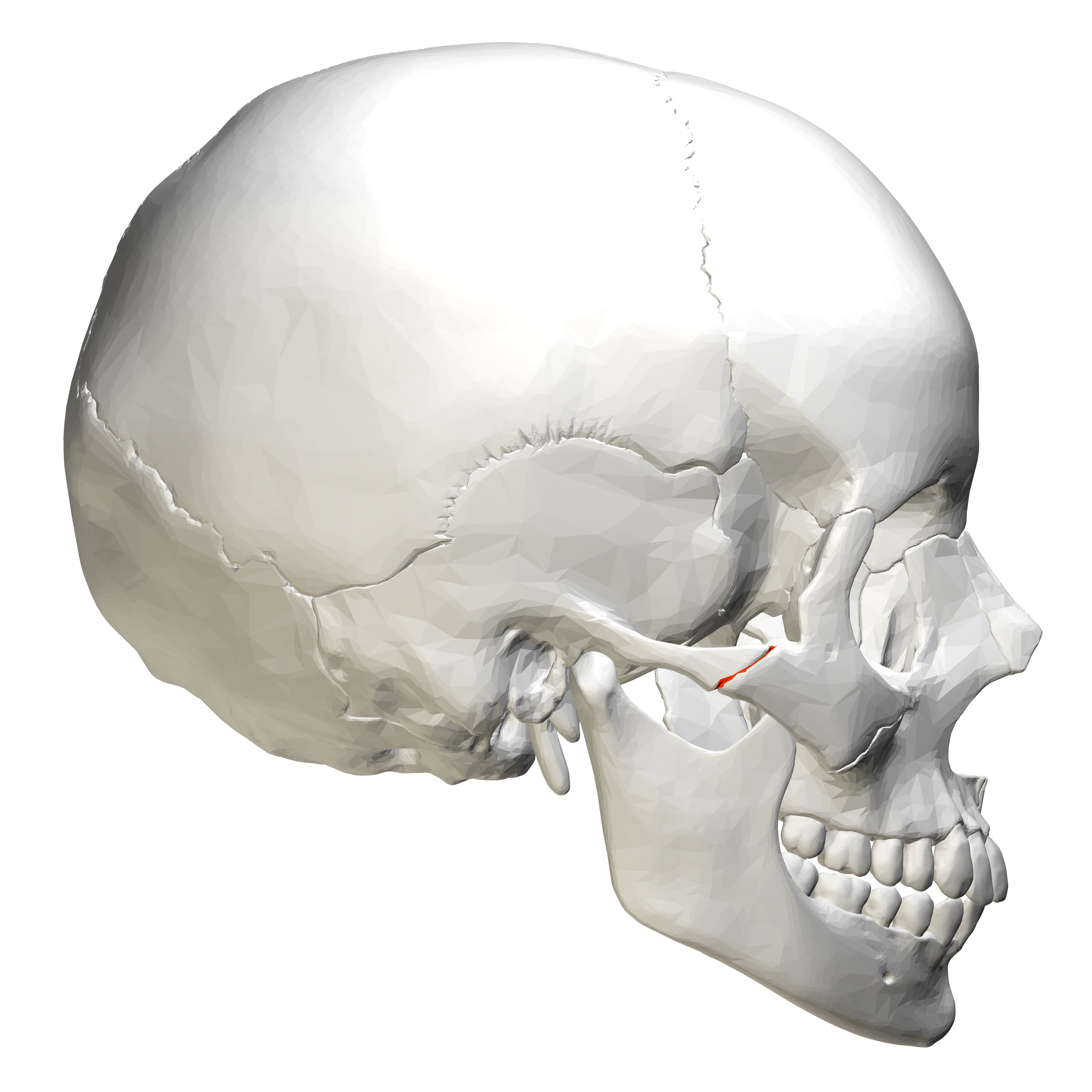
Still image (red)

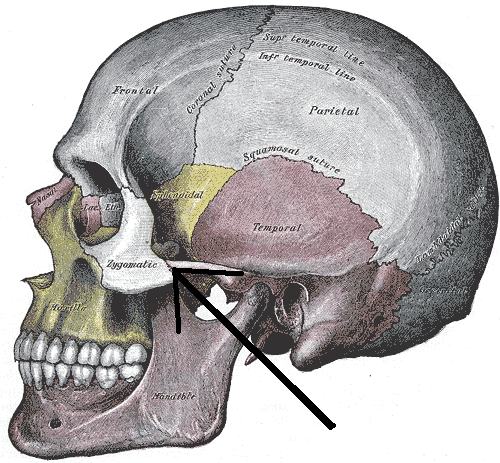
Side view of the skull. (Zygomaticotemporal suture is suture between zygomatic bone, at left in white, and temporal bone, at center in pink.)

== See also ==
- Zygomatic arch
