= Sphenoparietal suture =

Cranial suture

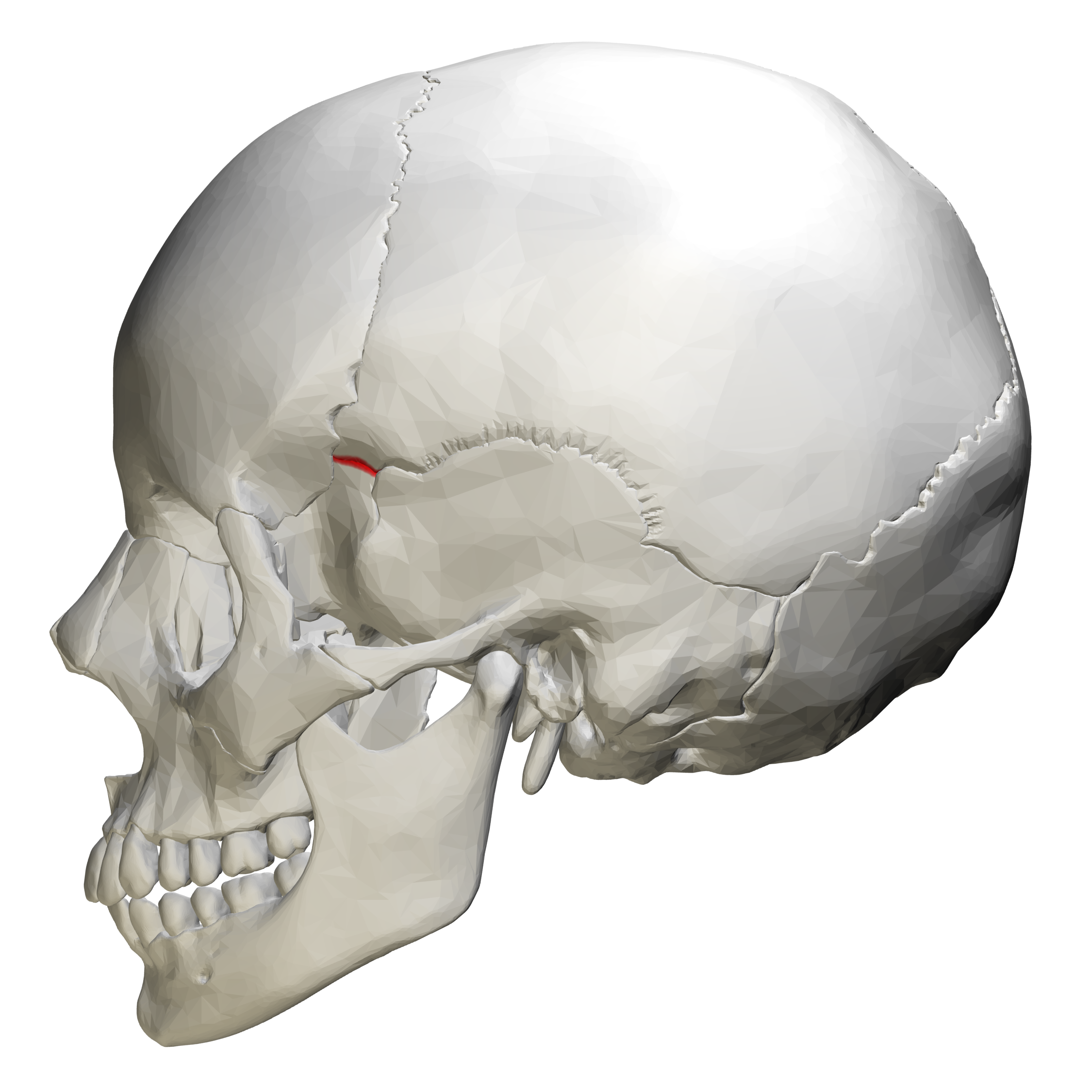
- Lateral view of sphenoparietal suture (red)

Details

Identifiers
- Latin: sutura sphenoparietalis
- TA98: A03.1.02.009
- TA2: 1583
- FMA: 52945

The sphenoparietal suture is the cranial suture between the sphenoid bone and the parietal bone. It is one of the sutures that comprises the pterion.

== Additional images ==
Position of sphenoparietal suture (shown in red). Animation.

Parietal bones (above) and sphenoid bone (below)

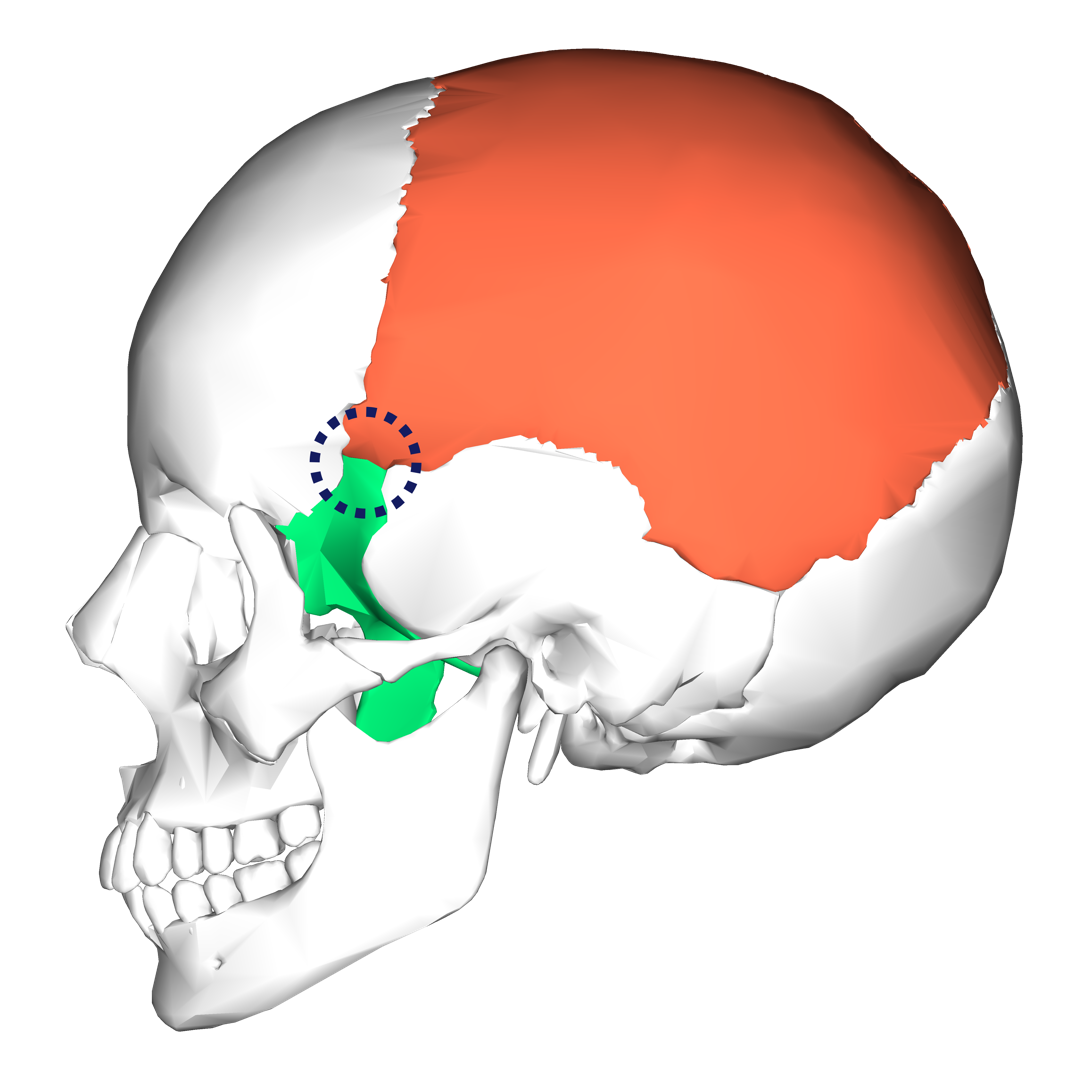
Position of sphenoparietal suture
Parietal bone
Sphenoid bone

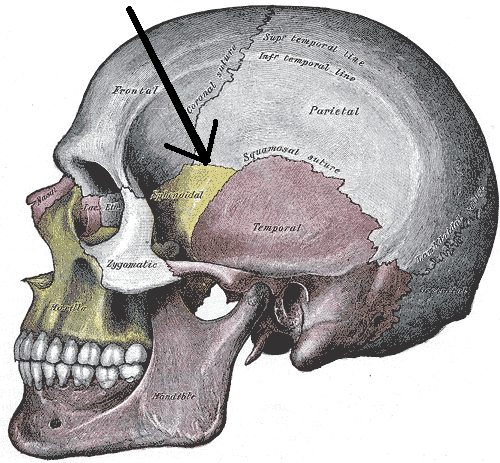
Side view of the skull. Sphenoparietal suture indicated by the arrow.

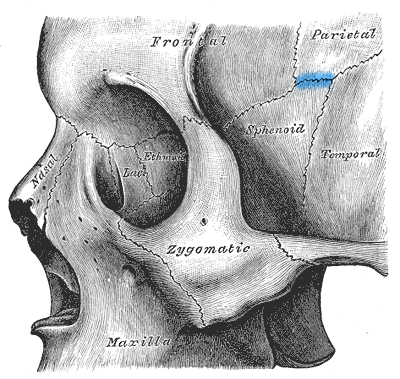
Left zygomatic bone in situ. (Sphenoparietal suture visible at upper right in blue.)
