= Syndesmosis =

Type of fibrous joint

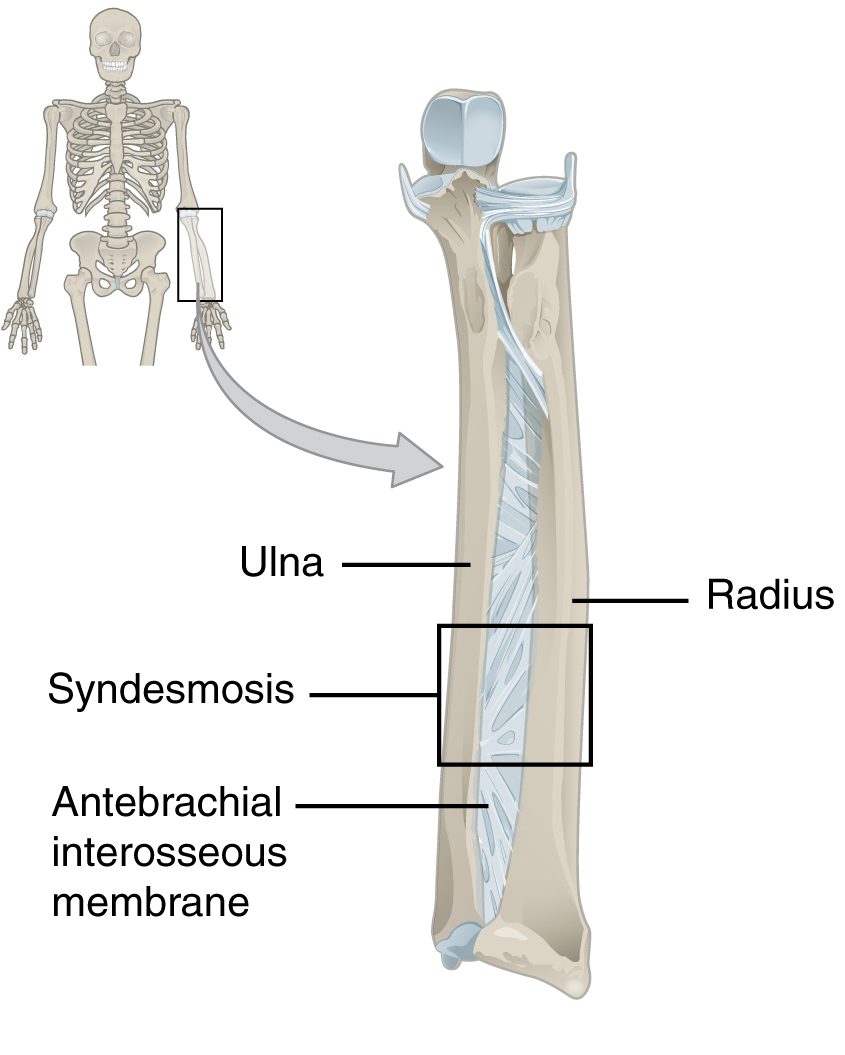
Syndesmosis between ulna and radius of upper arm

A syndesmosis (“fastened with a band”) is a type of fibrous joint in which two bones are united to each other by fibrous connective tissue. The gap between the bones may be narrow, with the bones joined by ligaments, or the gap may be wide and filled in by a broad sheet of connective tissue called an interosseous membrane. The syndesmoses found in the forearm and leg serve to unite parallel bones and prevent their separation.

== Examples ==
In the forearm, the wide gap between the shaft portions of the radius and ulna bones are strongly united by an interosseous membrane. Similarly, in the leg, the shafts of the tibia and fibula are also united by an interosseous membrane. In addition, at the inferior tibiofibular joint, the articulating surfaces of the bones lack cartilage and the narrow gap between the bones is anchored by fibrous connective tissue and ligaments on both the anterior and posterior aspects of the joint. Together, the interosseous membrane and these ligaments form the tibiofibular syndesmosis.

However, a syndesmosis does not prevent all movement between the bones, and thus this type of fibrous joint is functionally classified as an amphiarthrosis. In the leg, the syndesmosis between the tibia and fibula strongly unites the bones, allows for little movement, and firmly locks the talus bone in place between the tibia and fibula at the ankle joint. This provides strength and stability to the leg and ankle, which are important during weight bearing. In the forearm, the interosseous membrane is flexible enough to allow for rotation of the radius bone during forearm movements. Thus in contrast to the stability provided by the tibiofibular syndesmosis, the flexibility of the antebrachial interosseous membrane allows for the much greater mobility of the forearm.

== Pathology ==
The interosseous membranes of the leg and forearm also provide areas for muscle attachment. Damage to a syndesmotic joint, which usually results from a fracture of the bone with an accompanying tear of the interosseous membrane, will produce pain, loss of stability of the bones, and may damage the muscles attached to the interosseous membrane. If the fracture site is not properly immobilized with a cast or splint, contractile activity by these muscles can cause improper alignment of the broken bones during healing.

== Source text ==
This article incorporates text from a free content work. Licensed under CC BY 4.0. Text taken from Anatomy and Physiology, J. Gordon Betts et al, Openstax.
