= Sphenozygomatic suture =

Cranial suture between the sphenoid bone and the zygomatic bone

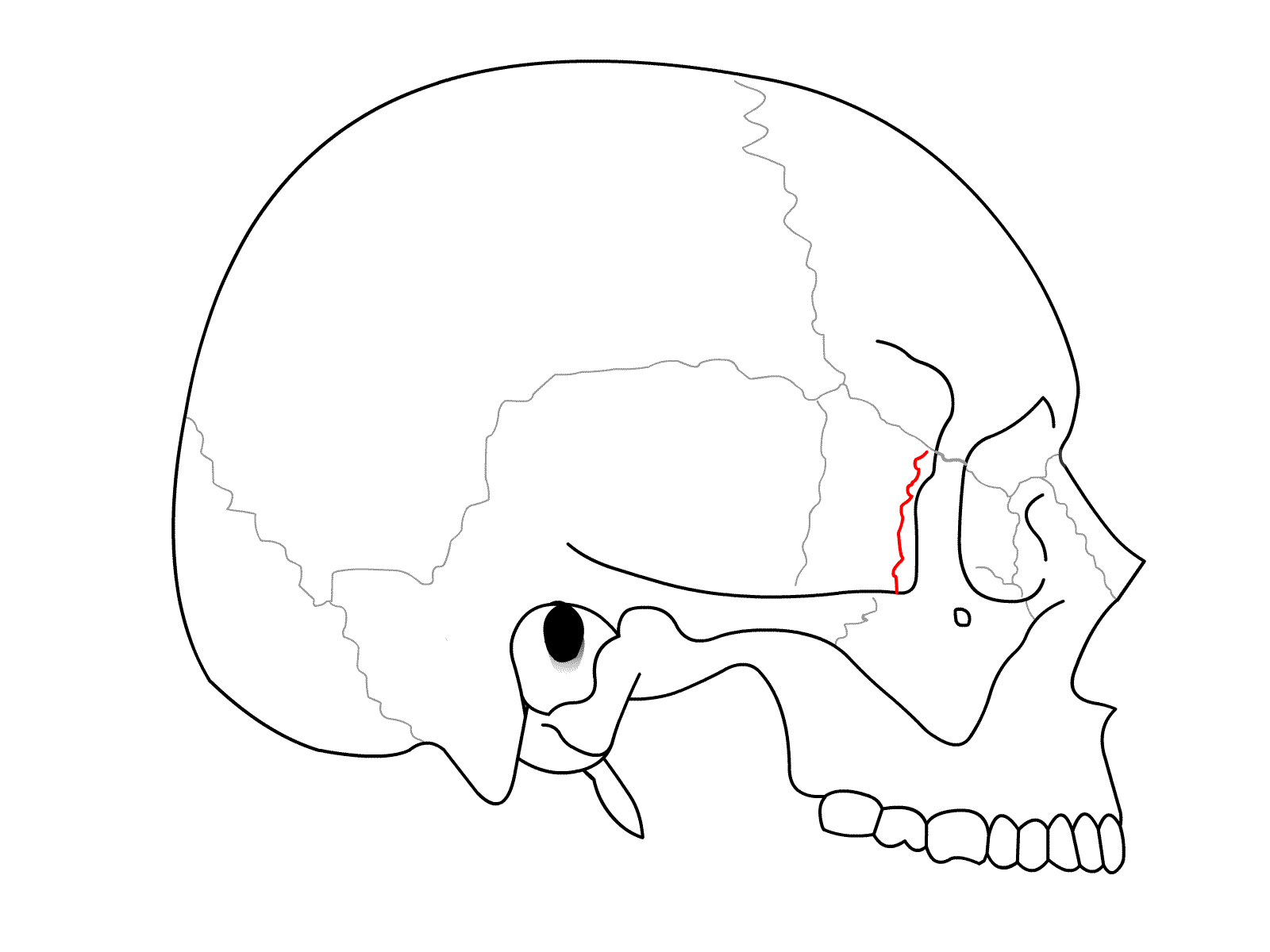
- Sphenozygomatic suture (highlighted in red)

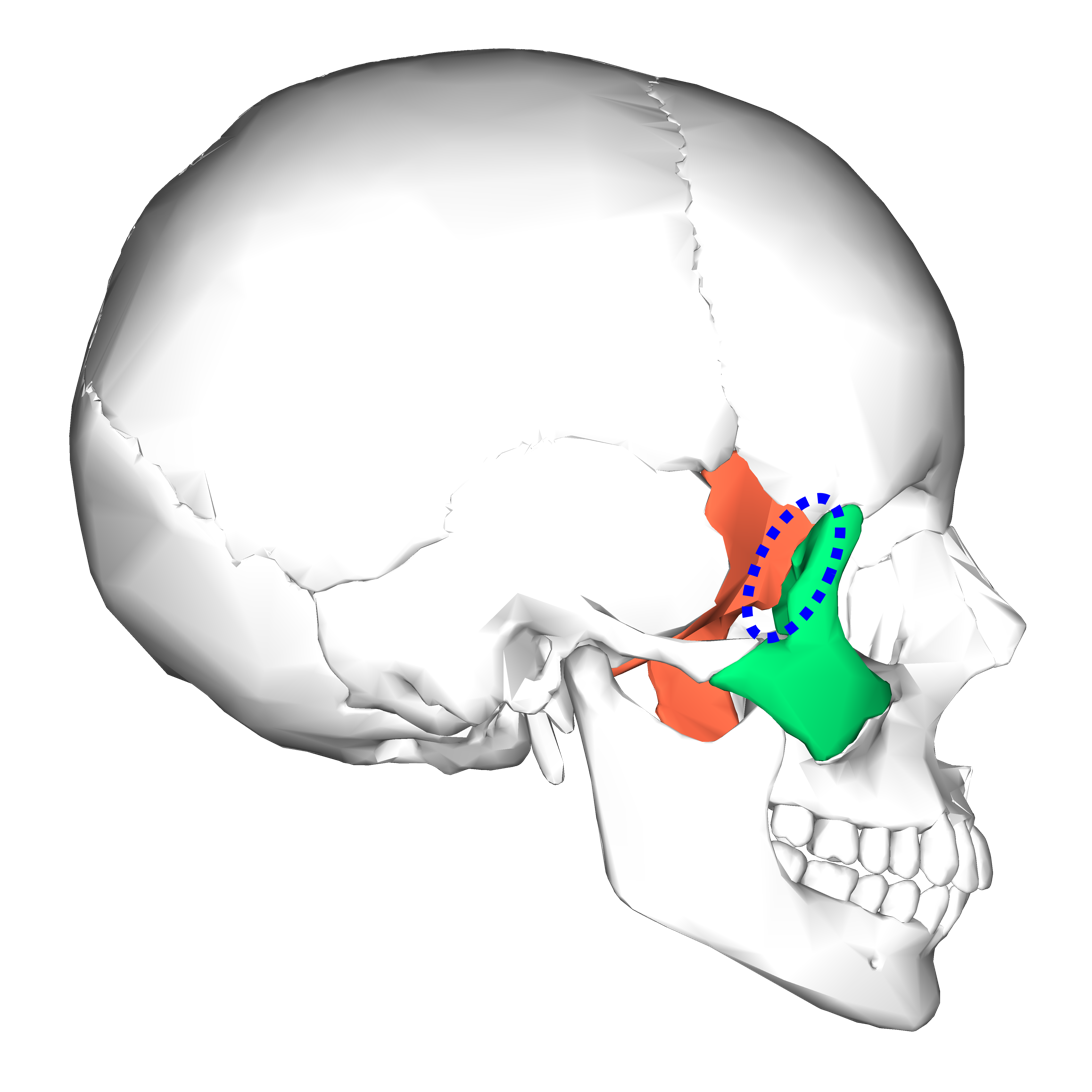
- Sphenozygomatic suture (blue circle); Sphenoid bone Zygomatic bone

Details

Identifiers
- Latin: sutura sphenozygomatica
- TA98: A03.1.02.022
- TA2: 1597
- FMA: 52956

The sphenozygomatic suture is the cranial suture between the sphenoid bone and the zygomatic bone.

== Additional images ==
Position of two bones, Animation.
Sphenoid bone
Zygomatic bone

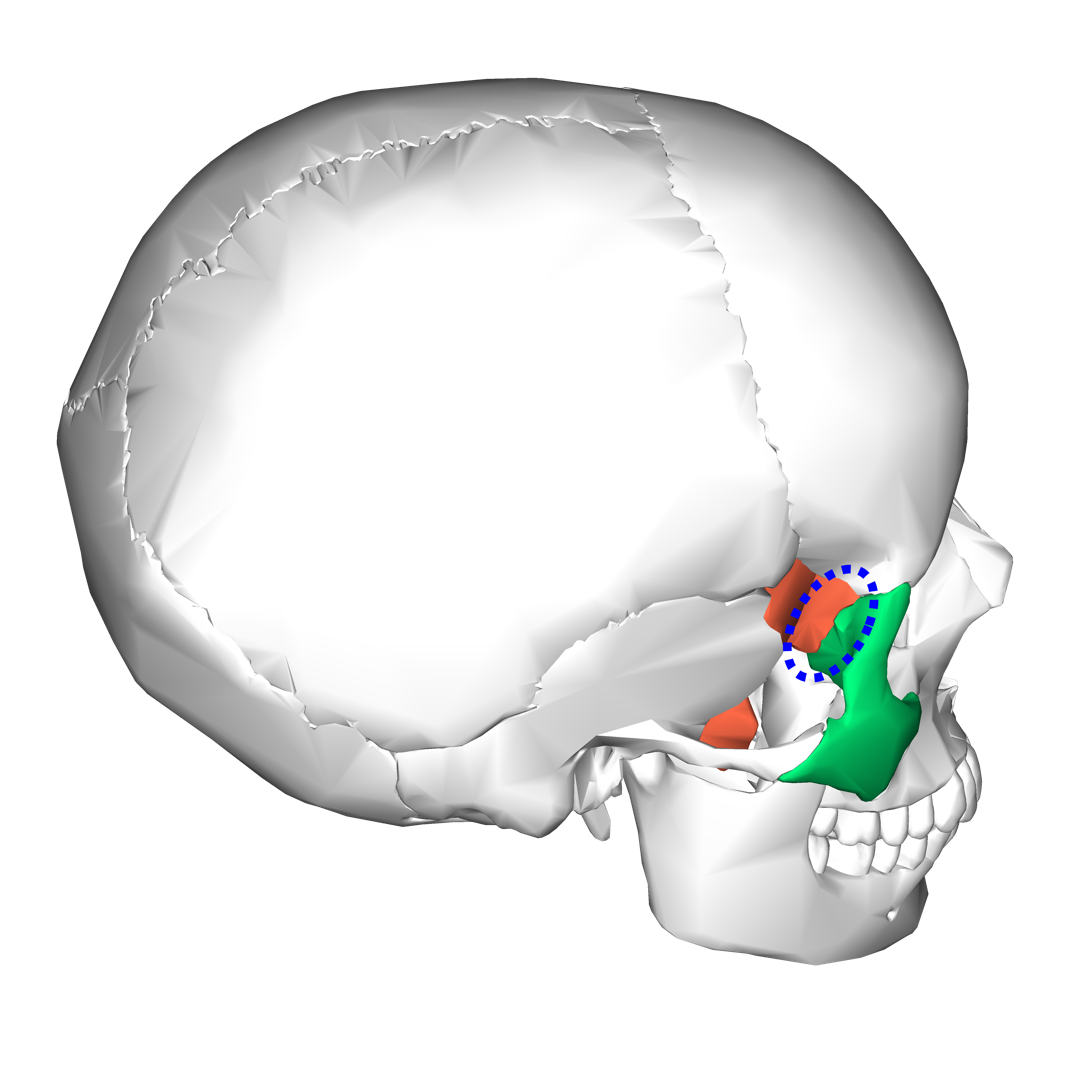
Sphenozygomatic suture (blue circle), seen from behind.

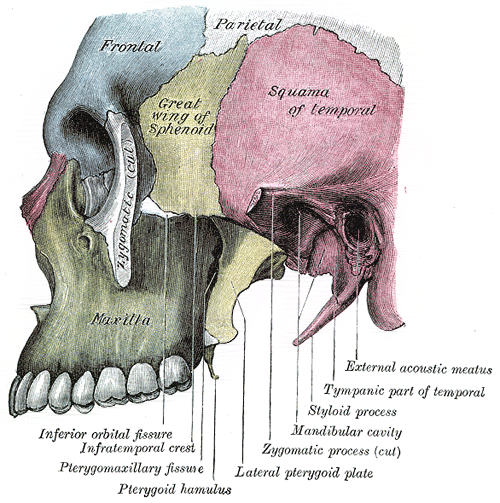
Side view of the skull. (Sphenozygomatic suture visible at center, between sphenoid bone, which is colored yellow in the diagram, and the zygomatic bone, which is colored in white.).

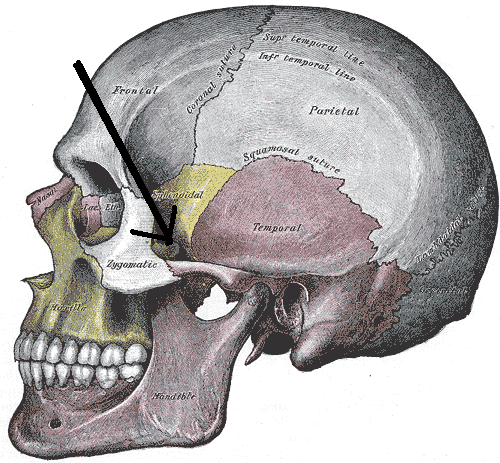
The skull from the side.
