= Zygomatic arch =

Cheek bone

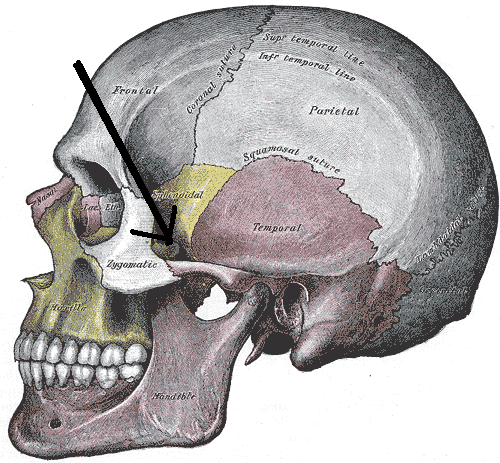
- Side view of the skull.

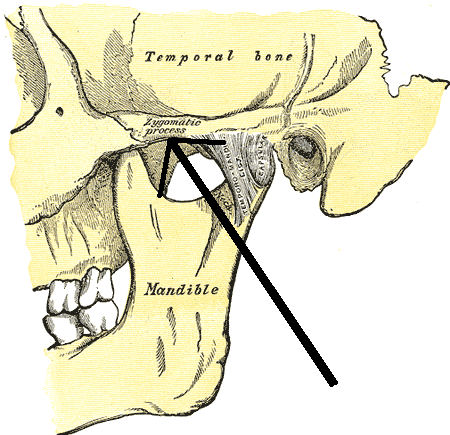
- Articulation of the mandible. Lateral aspect.

Details

Identifiers
- Latin: arcus zygomaticus
- MeSH: D015050
- TA98: A02.1.00.023
- TA2: 427
- FMA: 53120

In anatomy, the zygomatic arch is a part of the skull formed by the zygomatic process of the temporal bone (a bone extending forward from the side of the skull, over the opening of the ear) and the temporal process of the cheekbone, the two being united by an oblique suture (the zygomaticotemporal suture); the tendon of the temporal muscle passes medial to (i.e. through the middle of) the arch, to gain insertion into the coronoid process of the mandible (jawbone).

The jugal point is the point at the anterior (towards face) end of the upper border of the zygomatic arch where the masseteric and maxillary edges meet at an angle, and where it meets the process of the zygomatic bone.

The arch is typical of Synapsida ("fused arch"), a clade of amniotes that includes mammals and their extinct relatives, such as Moschops and Dimetrodon.

While the terms "zygomatic arch" and "cheekbone" are often used interchangeably, the arch is a specific anatomical structure within the cheekbone (zygomatic bone).

== Structure ==
The zygomatic process of the temporal arises by two roots:

- an anterior, directed inward in front of the mandibular fossa, where it expands to form the articular tubercle.
- a posterior, which runs backward above the external acoustic meatus and is continuous with the supramastoid crest.

The upper border of the arch gives attachment to the temporal fascia; the lower border and medial surface give origin to the masseter.

== Society and culture ==
High cheekbones are pronounced zygomatic arches, causing the upper part of the cheeks to jut out and form a line cut into the sides of the face. High cheekbones, forming a symmetrical face shape, are very common in fashion models and may be considered a beauty trait in both males and females within Eurocentric beauty standards.

== Etymology ==
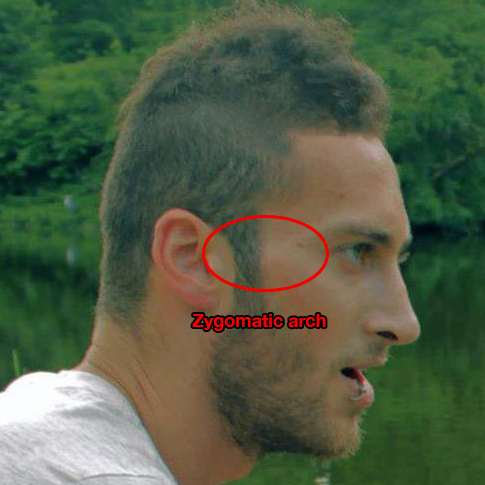
The zygomatic arch on a man

The term zygomatic derives from the Greek ζύγωμα zygōma, meaning "bolt, bar", derived from ζυγο-, "yoke, join". The Greek word was already used with this anatomical sense by Galen (2.437, 746) in the 2nd century AD. The zygomatic arch is occasionally referred to as the zygoma, but this term usually refers to the zygomatic bone or occasionally the zygomatic process.

== Other animals ==
The zygomatic arch is significant in evolutionary biology, as it is part of the structures derived from the ancestral single temporal fenestra of the synapsid ancestor of mammals.

== Additional images ==
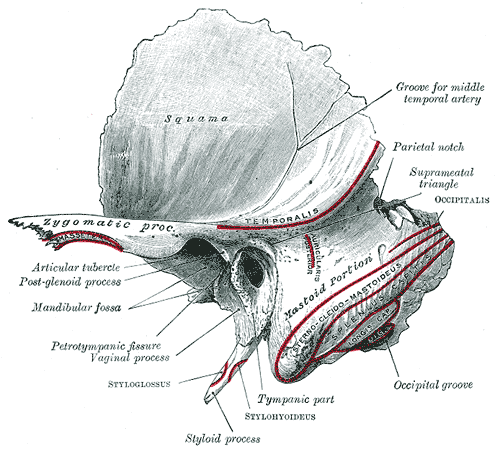
Left temporal bone, outer surface

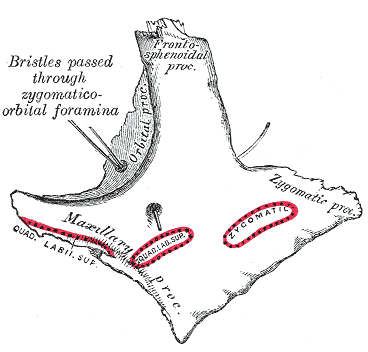
Left zygomatic bone, malar surface

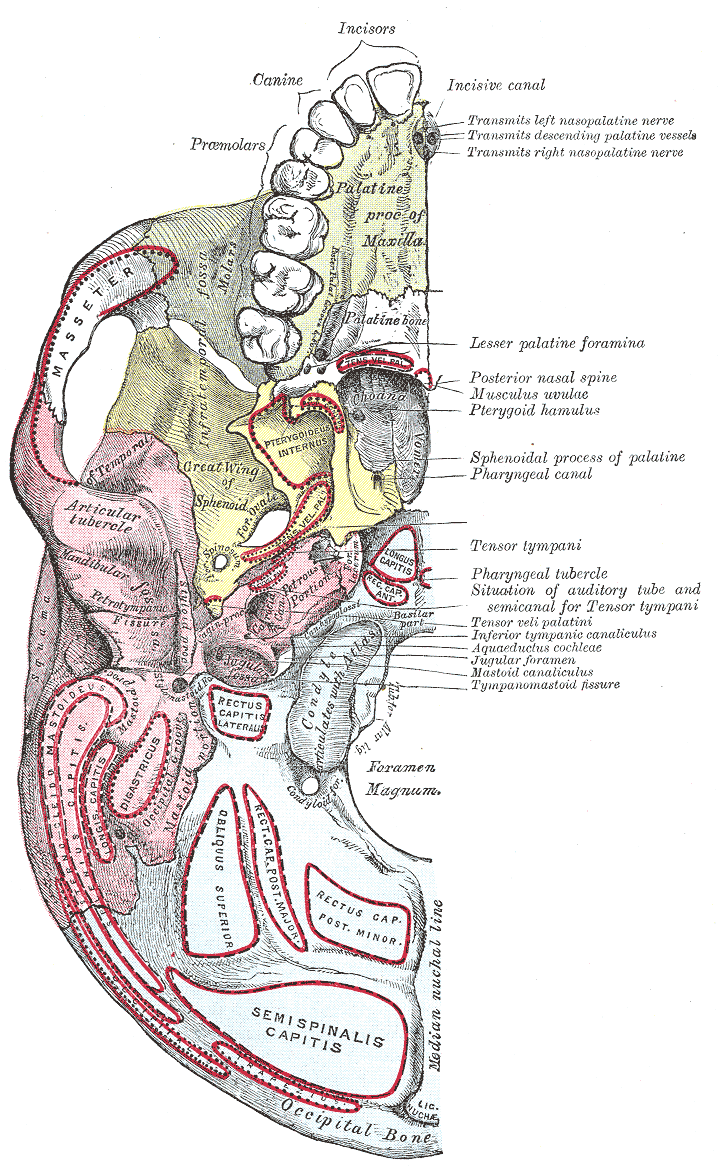
Base of skull, inferior surface

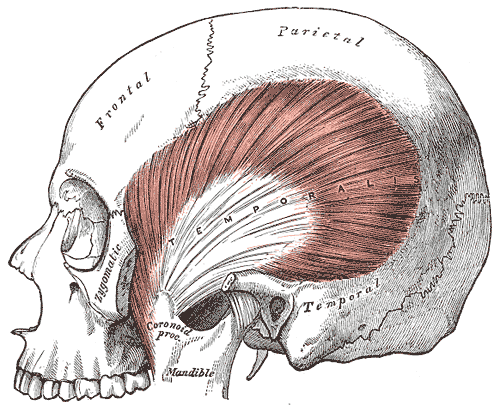
The temporalis; the zygomatic arch and masseter have been removed.

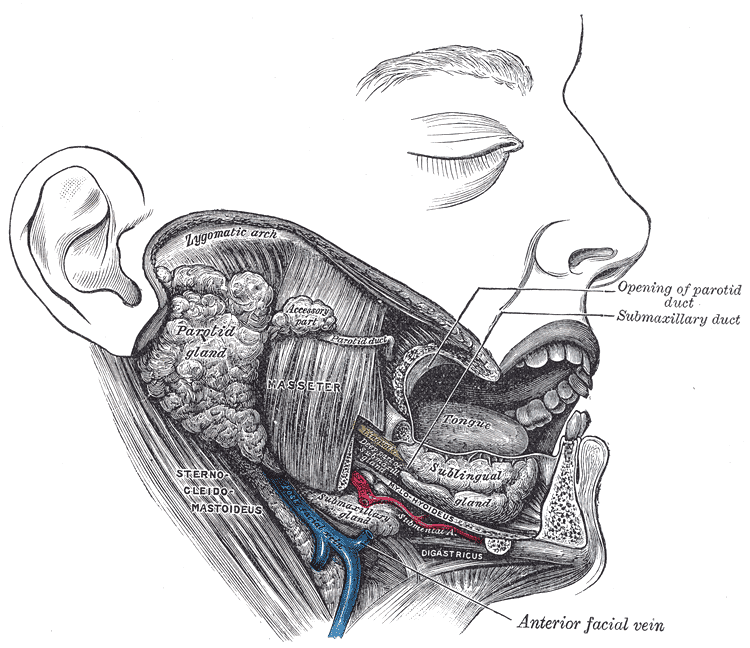
Dissection, showing salivary glands of right side

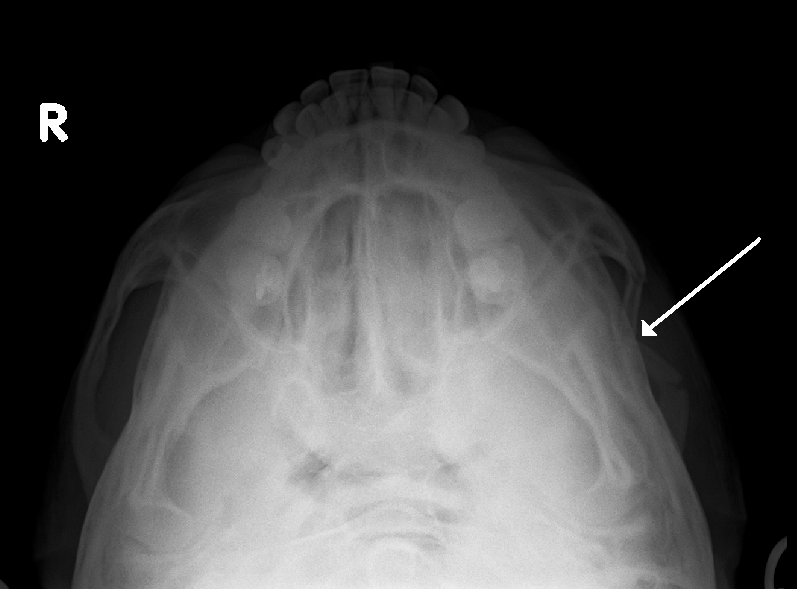
Fracture of the zygomatic arch as seen on plain X-ray

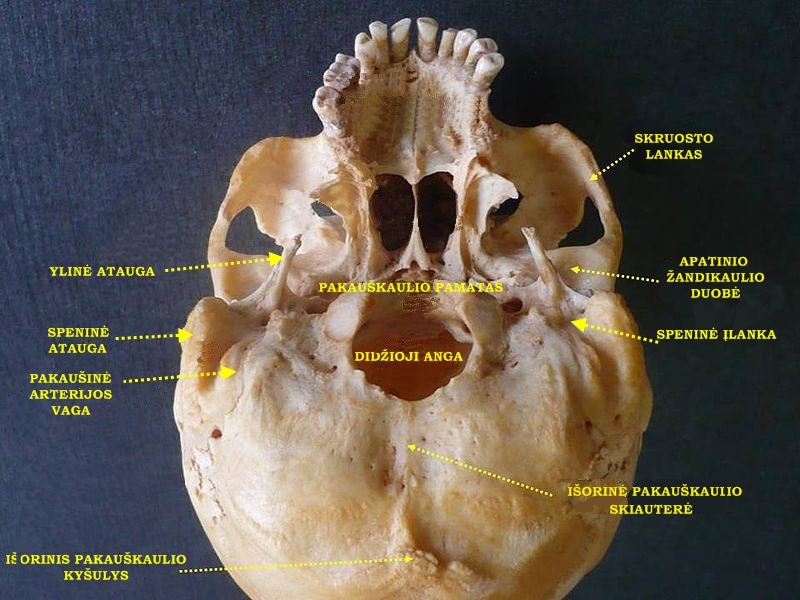
Zygomatic arch, base of skull

== See also ==
- Zygoma fracture
- Zygomasseteric system
- Zygomatic complex fracture
- Zygomaticotemporal suture
