= Sphenofrontal suture =

Cranial suture between the sphenoid bone and the frontal bone

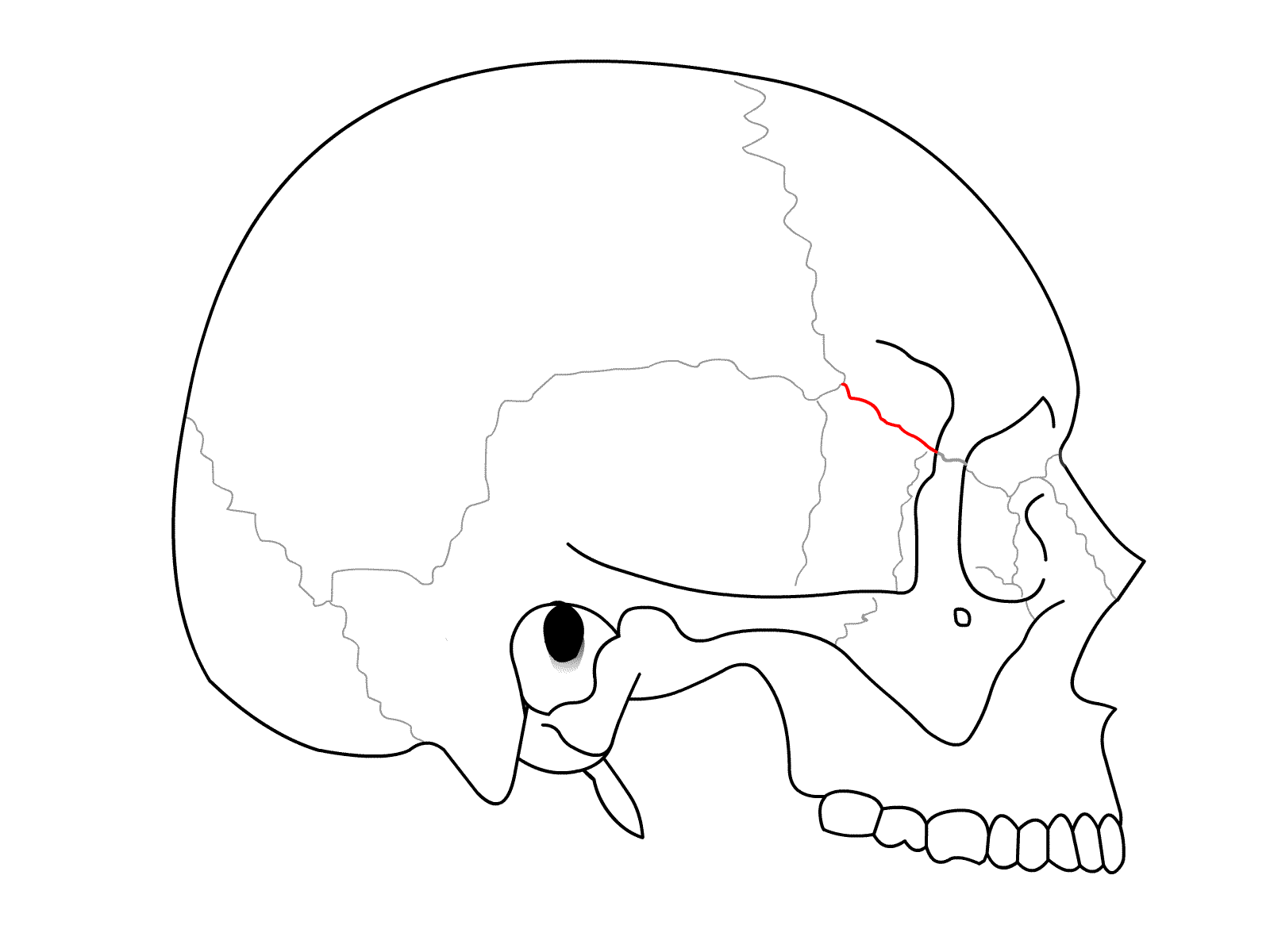
- Sphenofrontal suture (shown in red).

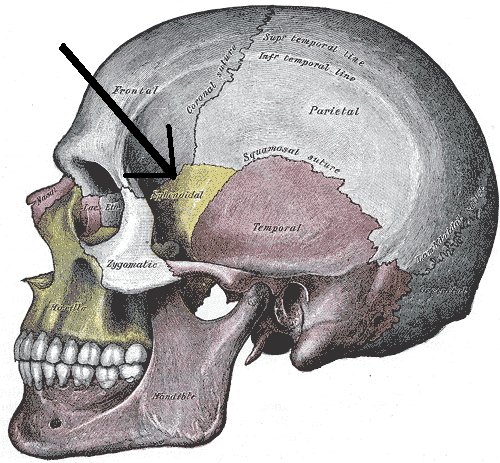
- Side view of the skull. (Sphenofrontal suture visible at center, between sphenoid bone, which is colored yellow in the diagram, and the frontal bone, which is colored in gray, and is at the upper left.).

Details

Identifiers
- Latin: sutura sphenofrontalis
- TA98: A03.1.02.006
- TA2: 1580
- FMA: 52938

The sphenofrontal suture is the cranial suture between the sphenoid bone and the frontal bone.

== Additional images ==
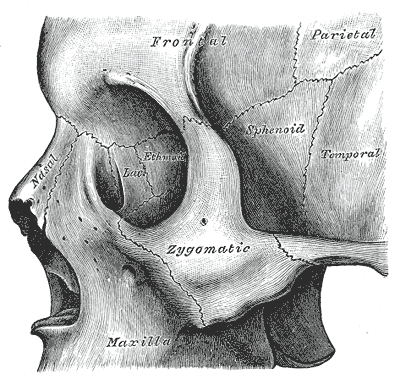
The skull from the side.

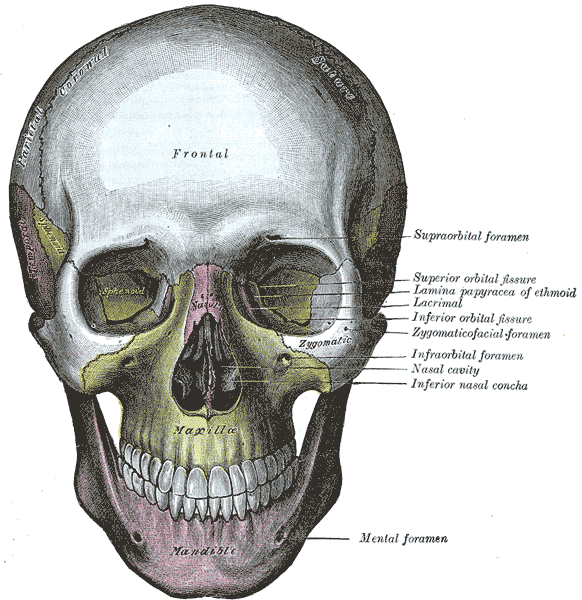
The skull from the front.

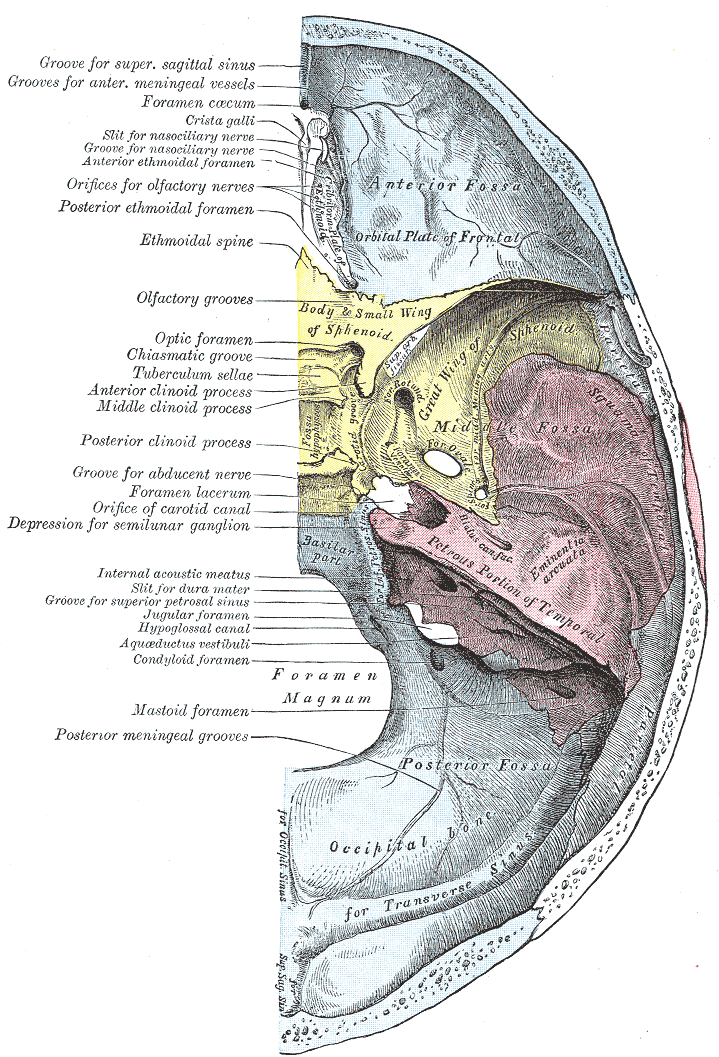
Base of the skull. Upper surface.
