= Zygomaticofrontal suture =

Cranial suture

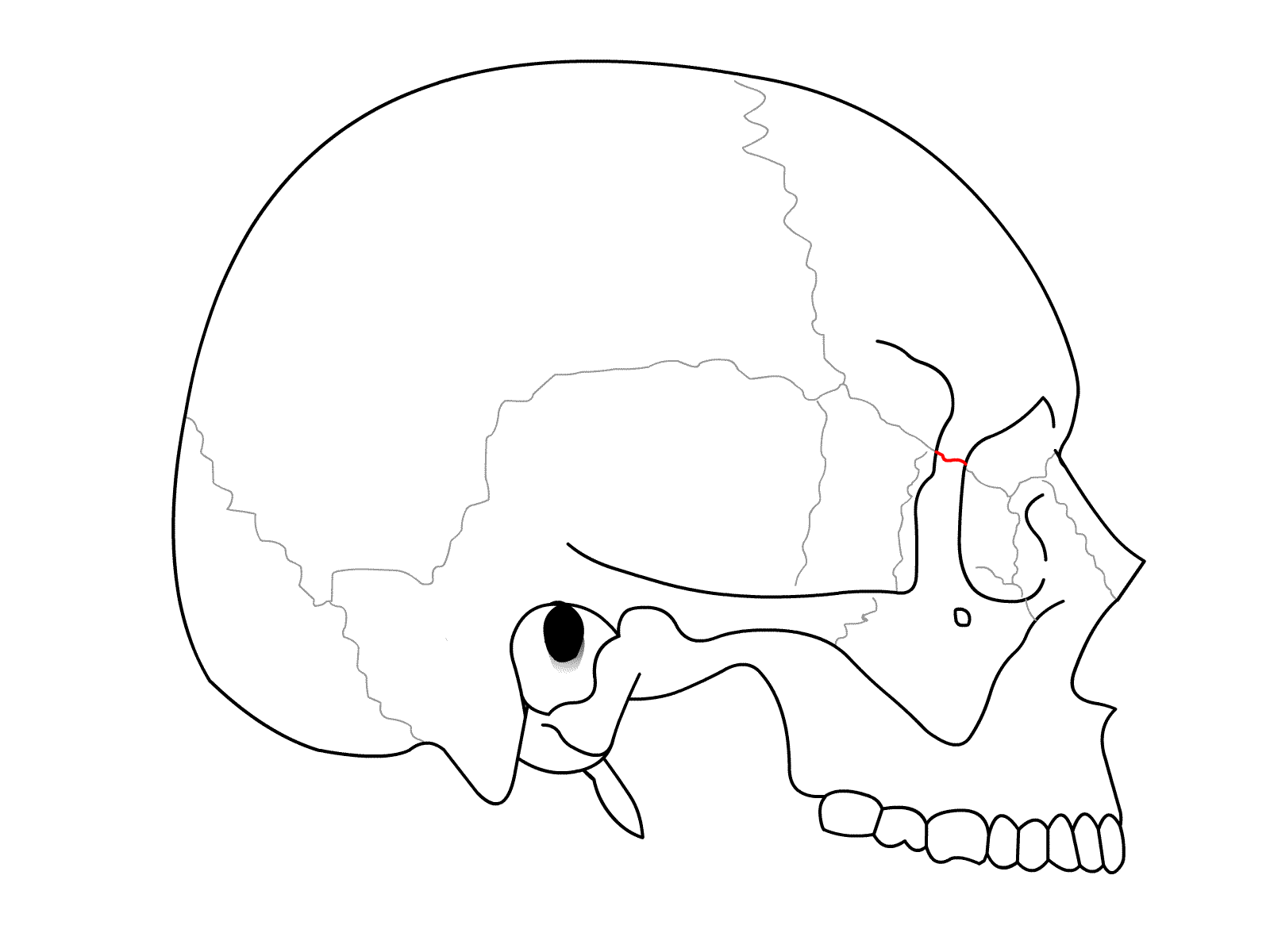
- Side view of zygomaticofrontal suture

- Side view of head, showing surface relations of bones (zygomaticofrontal suture labeled at center left)

Details

Identifiers
- Latin: sutura frontozygomatica
- TA98: A03.1.02.017
- TA2: 1592
- FMA: 52952

The zygomaticofrontal suture (or frontozygomatic suture) is the cranial suture between the zygomatic bone and the frontal bone. The suture can be palpated just lateral to the eye.

== Additional images ==
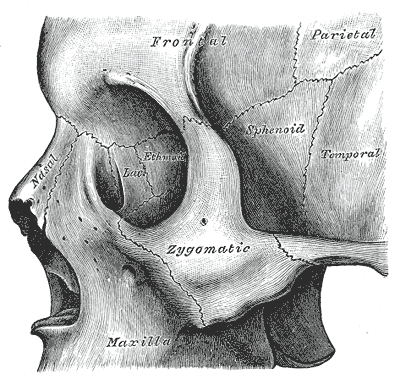
Left zygomatic bone in situ.

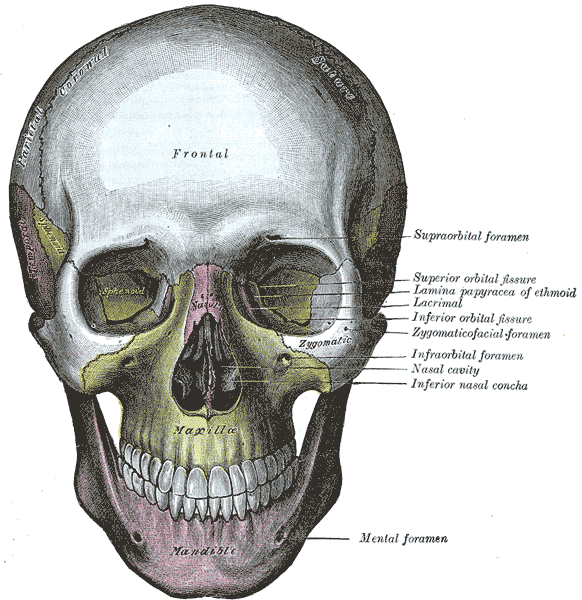
The skull from the front.
