= Amphiarthrosis =

Type of joint

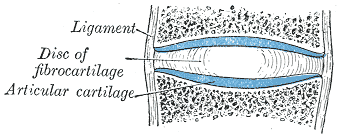
- Diagrammatic section of a symphysis.

Identifiers
- TA98: A03.0.00.052
- TA2: 1551
- FMA: 76693

Amphiarthrosis is a type of continuous, slightly movable joint. Most amphiarthroses are held together by muscles, as a result of which limited movements between the bones are made possible. An example is the joints of the vertebral column, which only allow for small movements between adjacent vertebrae. However, when combined, these movements provide the flexibility that allows the body to twist, bend forward, backwards, or to the side.

== Types ==
In amphiarthroses, the contiguous bony surfaces can be:

- A symphysis: connected by broad flattened disks of fibrocartilage, of a more or less complex structure, which adhere to the ends of each bone, as in the articulations between the bodies of the vertebrae or the inferior articulation of the two hip bones (aka the pubic symphysis). The strength of the pubic symphysis is important in conferring weight-bearing stability to the pelvis.
- An interosseous membrane - the sheet of connective tissue joining neighboring bones (e.g. tibia and fibula).
