= Squamosal bone =

Skull bone in most reptiles, amphibians and birds

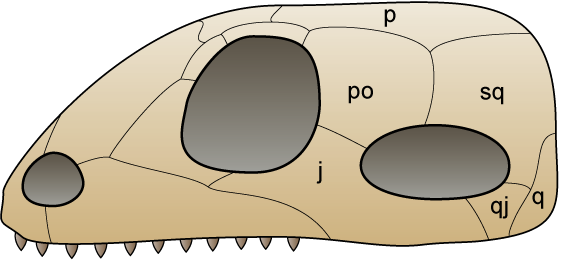
A schematic of a synapsid skull showing the location of major dermal bones, including the squamosal bone (Sq)

The squamosal is a skull bone found in most reptiles, amphibians, and birds. In fishes, it is also called the pterotic bone.

In most tetrapods, the squamosal and quadratojugal bones form the cheek series of the skull. The bone forms an ancestral component of the dermal roof and is typically thin compared to other skull bones.

The squamosal bone lies ventral to the temporal series and otic notch, and is bordered anteriorly by the postorbital. Posteriorly, the squamosal articulates with the quadrate and pterygoid bones. The squamosal is bordered anteroventrally by the jugal and ventrally by the quadratojugal.

== Function in reptiles ==
In reptiles, the quadrate and articular bones of the skull articulate to form the jaw joint. The squamosal bone lies anterior to the quadrate bone.

== Anatomy in synapsids ==
=== Non-mammalian synapsids ===
In non-mammalian synapsids, the jaw is composed of four bony elements and referred to as a quadro-articular jaw because the joint is between the articular and quadrate bones. In therapsids (advanced synapsids including mammalians), the jaw is simplified into an articulation between the dentary and the squamous part of the temporal bone, and hence referred to as a dentary-squamosal jaw.

=== Mammals ===
In many mammals, including humans, the squamosal fuses with the periotic bone and the auditory bulla to form the temporal bone, then referred to as the squama temporalis.

In mammals, the quadrate bone evolves to form the incus, one of the ossicles of the mammalian ear. Similarly, the articular bone evolves to form the malleus. The squamosal bone migrates and lengthens to become a new point of articulation with the lower jaw (at the dentary bone).
