= Sphenosquamosal suture =

Cranial suture

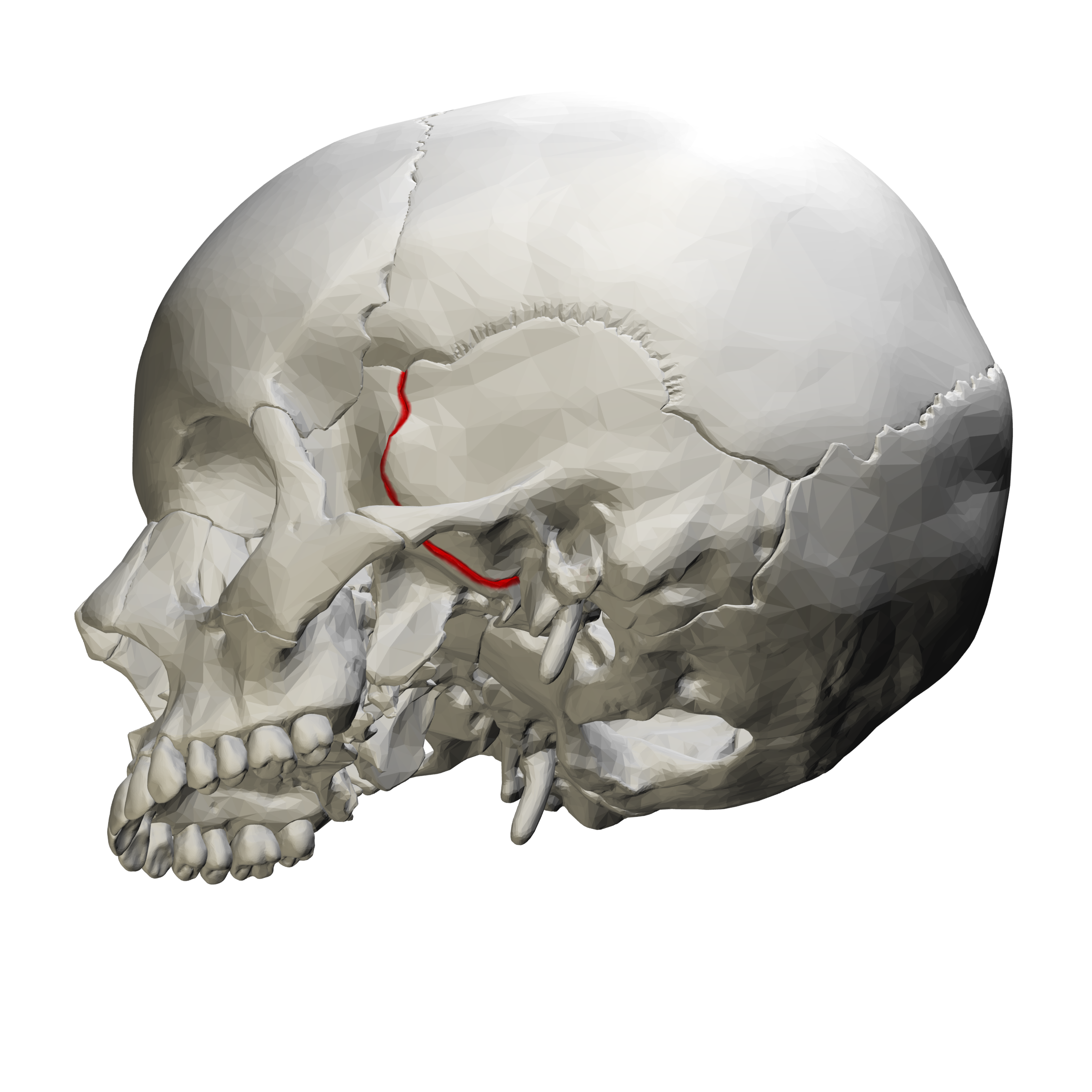
- Inferolateral view of sphenosquamosal suture (red)

Details

Identifiers
- Latin: sutura sphenosquamosa
- TA98: A03.1.02.008
- TA2: 1582
- FMA: 52944

The sphenosquamosal suture is a cranial suture between the sphenoid bone and the squama of the temporal bone.

== Additional images ==
Animation of sphenosquamosal suture

Position on sphenoid bone
