= Anterior wall =

Anterior wall may refer to:

- Carotid wall of tympanic cavity
- The anterior wall of the heart

== See also ==
- Anatomical terms of location#Anterior and posterior
