= Ligaments of malleus =

Ligaments of the middle ear

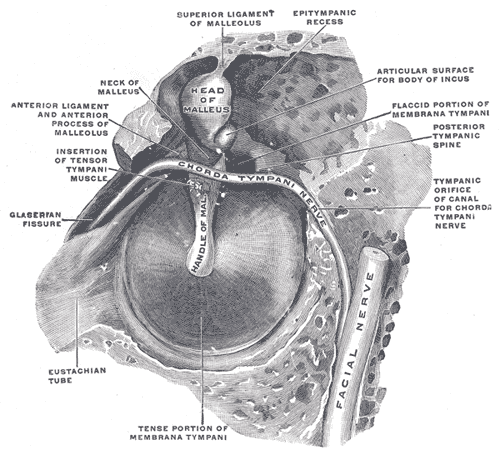
- The right membrana tympani with the hammer and the chorda tympani, viewed from within, from behind, and from above.

Details
- From: Tympanic cavity
- To: Malleus

Identifiers
- Latin: ligamenta mallei

The ligaments of malleus are three ligaments that attach the malleus in the middle ear. They are the anterior, lateral and superior ligaments.

The anterior ligament of the malleus also known as Casserio's ligament is a fibrous band that extends from the neck of the malleus just above its anterior process to the anterior wall of the tympanic cavity close to the petrotympanic fissure. Some of the fibers also pass through the fissure to the spine of sphenoid bone.

The lateral ligament of the malleus is a triangular fibrous band that crosses from the posterior aspect of the tympanic notch to the head or neck of the malleus.

The superior ligament of the malleus is a delicate fibrous strand that crosses from the roof of the tympanic cavity to the head of the malleus.

== Additional images ==
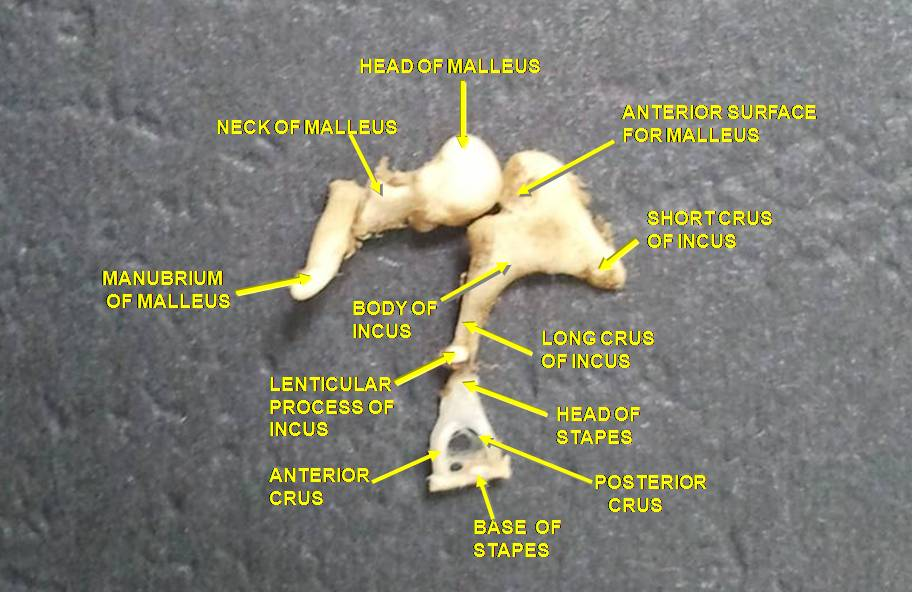
Auditory ossicles. Tympanic cavity. Deep dissection.
