= Tympanic part of the temporal bone =

Middle part of the sides of the skull base, surrounding the ear canal

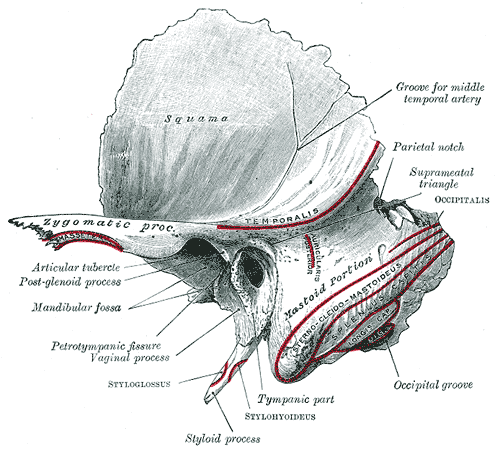
- Left temporal bone. Outer surface. (Tympanic part at bottom center.)

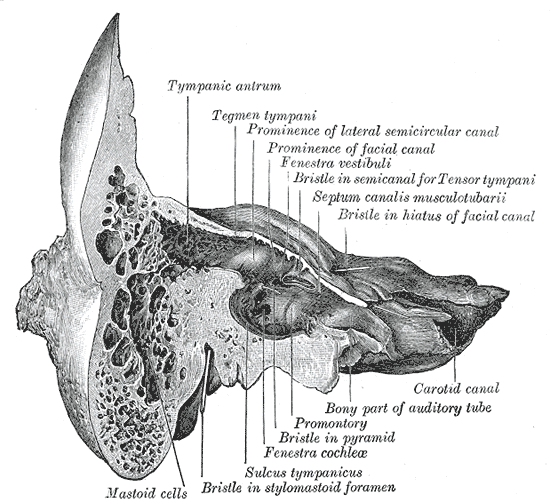
- Coronal section of right temporal bone.

Details

Identifiers
- Latin: pars tympanica ossis temporalis
- TA98: A02.1.06.052
- TA2: 693
- FMA: 52880

The tympanic part of the temporal bone is a curved plate of bone lying below the squamous part of the temporal bone, in front of the mastoid process, and surrounding the external part of the ear canal.

It originates as a separate bone (tympanic bone), which in some mammals stays separate through life.

Evolutionarily, a portion of it is derived from the angular bone of the reptilian lower jaw.

== Surfaces ==
Its postero-superior surface is concave, and forms the anterior wall, the floor, and part of the posterior wall of the bony ear canal.

Medially, it presents a narrow furrow, the tympanic sulcus, for the attachment of the tympanic membrane.

Its antero-inferior surface is quadrilateral and slightly concave; it constitutes the posterior boundary of the mandibular fossa, and is in contact with the retromandibular part of the parotid gland.

== Borders ==
Its lateral border is free and rough, and gives attachment to the cartilaginous part of the ear canal. Internally, the tympanic part is fused with the petrous portion, and appears in the retreating angle between it and the squama, where it lies below and lateral to the orifice of the auditory tube. Posteriorly, it blends with the squama and mastoid part, and forms the anterior boundary of the tympanomastoid fissure.

Its upper border fuses laterally with the back of the postglenoid process, while medially it bounds the petrotympanic fissure.

The medial part of the lower border is thin and sharp; its lateral part splits to enclose the root of the styloid process, and is therefore named the vaginal process.

== Ear canal ==
The central portion of the tympanic part is thin, as it gives rise to the bony inner two-thirds of the ear canal, and in 5 - 20% of skulls the lower surface is perforated by a hole, the foramen of Huschke that opens onto the temporomandibular joint due to incomplete fusion of the anterior and posterior prominences during development.

The bony portion of the ear canal is nearly 2 cm long and is directed inward and slightly forward: at the same time it forms a slight curve, so that the floor of the canal is convex upward. In sagittal section it presents an oval or elliptical shape with the long axis directed downward and slightly backward. Its anterior wall and floor and the lower part of its posterior wall are formed by the tympanic part; the roof and upper part of the posterior wall by the squama. Its inner end is closed, by the tympanic membrane which originates from the tympanic sulcus; the upper limit of its outer orifice is formed by the posterior root of the zygomatic process, immediately below which there is sometimes seen a small spine, the suprameatal spine, situated at the upper and posterior part of the orifice.

The auditory bulla (pl. bullae) is a hollow bony structure on the ventral, posterior portion of the skull in many mammals, that encloses parts of the middle and inner ear. In most species, it is formed by the tympanic part of the temporal bone. In humans and many other primates the middle ear is enclosed within the temporal bone but not in a bulla.

== Other animals ==
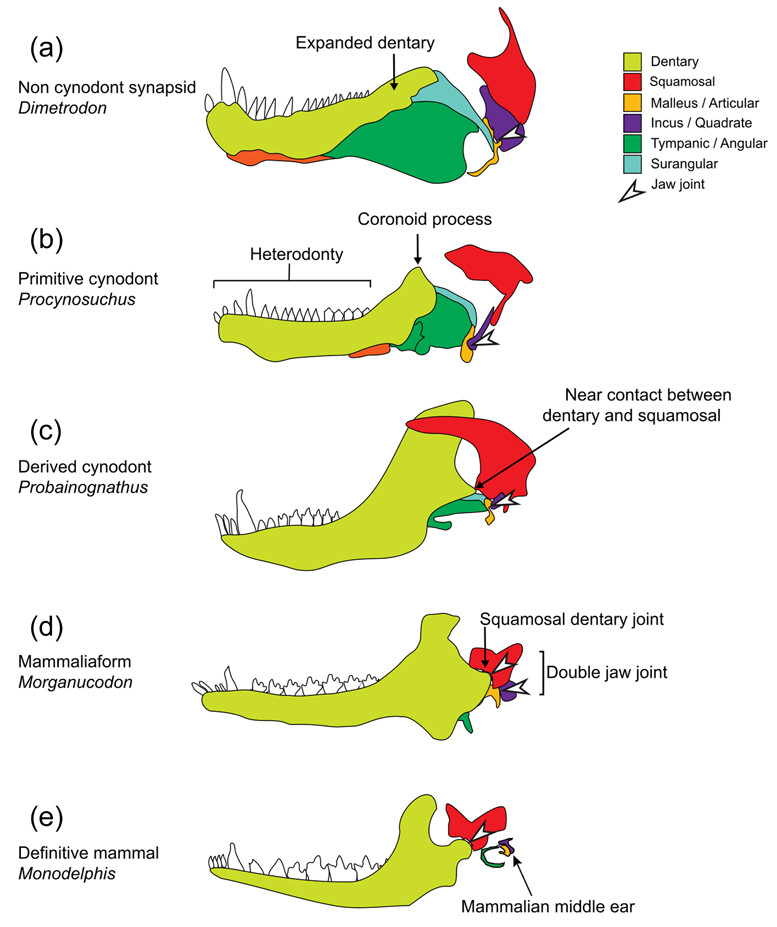
Diagram showing synapsid jaw evolution from early "pelycosaur" synapsids to modern mammals with the tympanic/angular in dark green

In all extant and extinct primates, including humans, the auditory bulla is formed by the petrosal bone (the petrous part of the temporal bone). This is a diagnostic trait that can be used to distinguish primates, including anthropoids, tarsiers, lemurs, and lorises, from all other mammals.

== Additional images ==
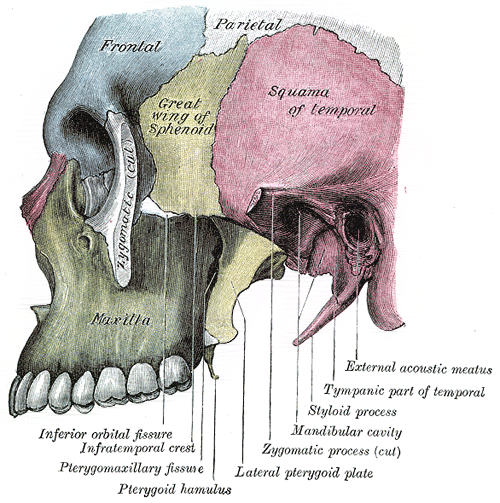
Left infratemporal fossa.

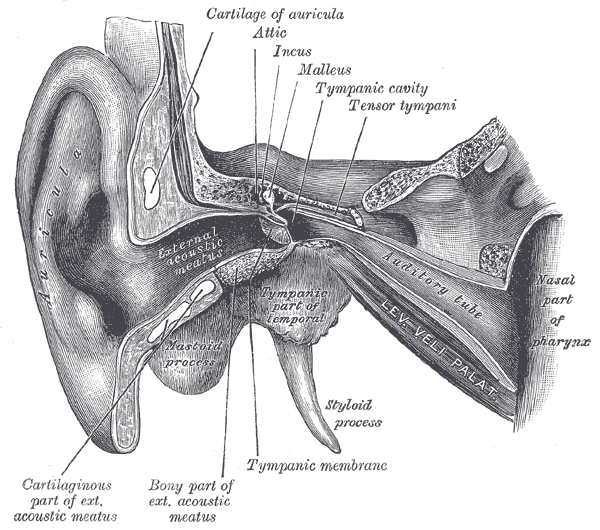
External and middle ear, opened from the front. Right side.

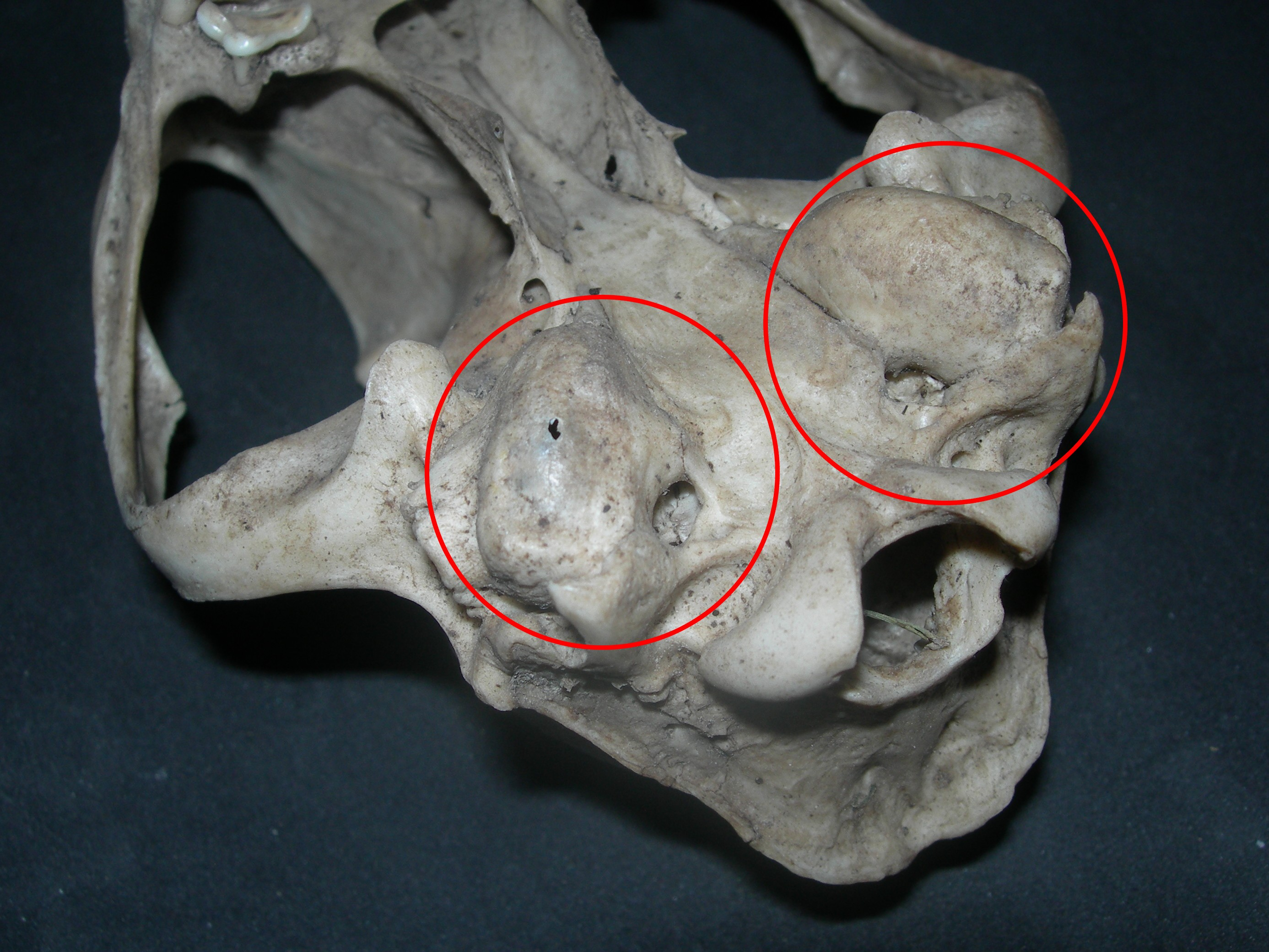
Auditory bullae on a red fox skull (Vulpes vulpes).
