= Petrosquamous suture =

Anatomic feature of the human skull

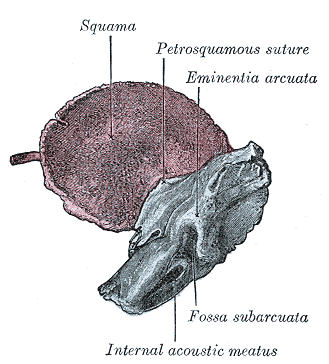
- Temporal bone at birth. Inner aspect.

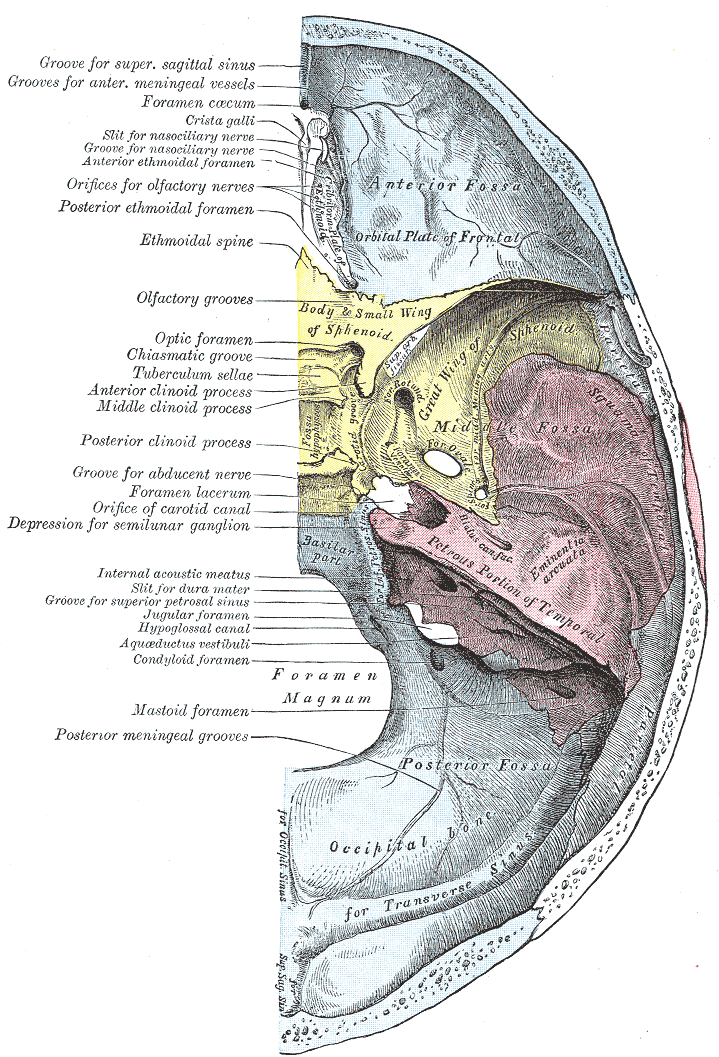
- Base of the skull. Upper surface. (Temporal bone is in pink.)

Details

Identifiers
- Latin: sutura petrosquamosa
- TA98: A02.1.06.075
- TA2: 718
- FMA: 55466

The petrosquamous suture is a cranial suture between the petrous portion and the squama of the temporal bone. It forms the Koerner's septum. The petrous portion forms the medial component of the osseous margin, while the squama forms the lateral component. The anterolateral portion (squama) arises from the mesenchyme at 8 weeks of embryogenesis while the petromastoid portion develops later from a cartilaginous center at 6 months of fetal development.

In certain people, it can contain an emissary vein, referred to as the petrosquamosal sinus. Being aware of this anatomic variant with preoperative CT scanning can be important to prevent bleeding in certain types of otolaryngological surgeries. Some authors have theorized that a persistent venous sinus reflects an arrest in embryologic development.

== See also ==
- Petrotympanic fissure
