= Posterior wall =

The posterior wall may refer to:

- Acetabulum
- Mastoid wall of tympanic cavity
- The posterior wall of a cardiac ventricle
