= Squamosal suture =

Cranial suture

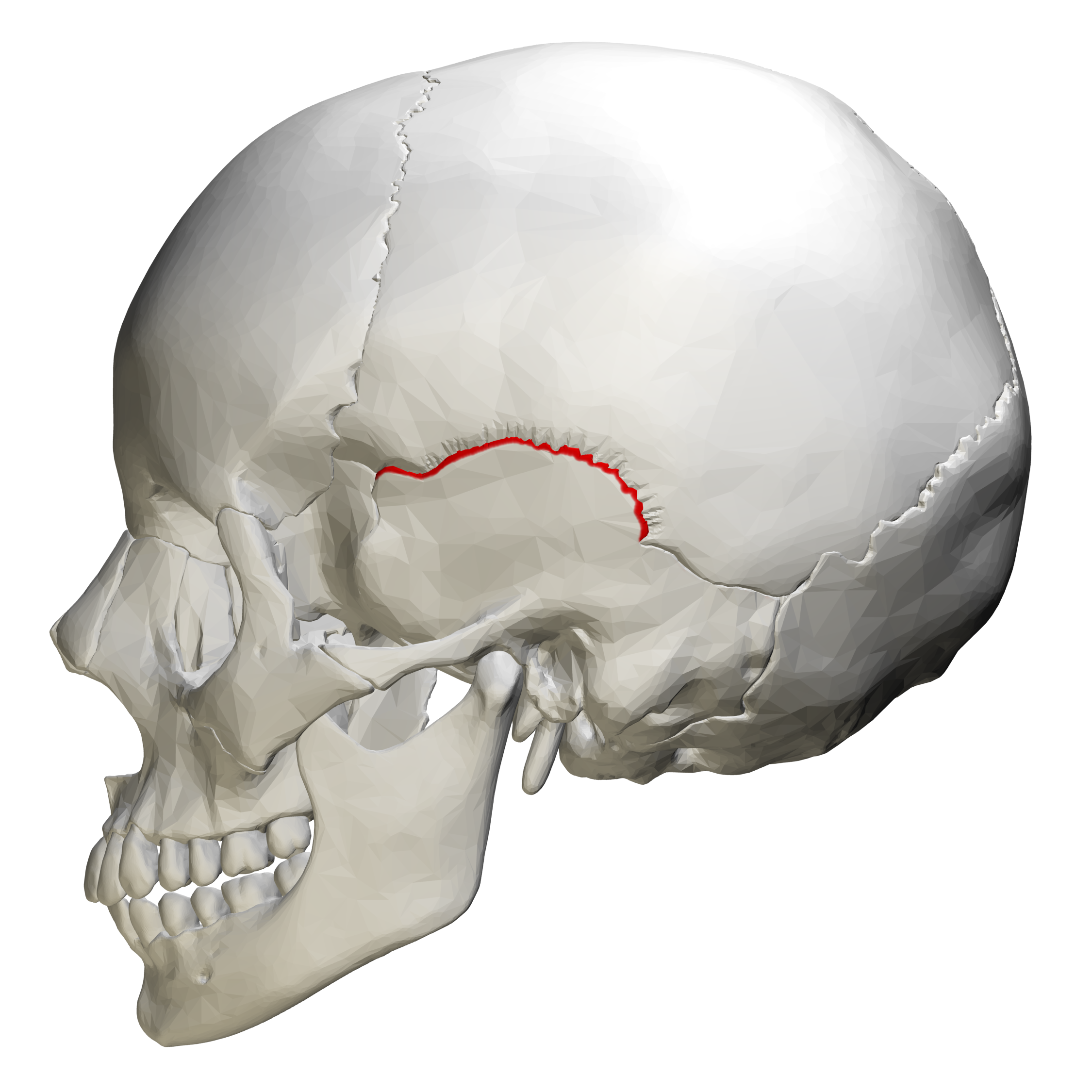
- Lateral view squamosal suture (red)

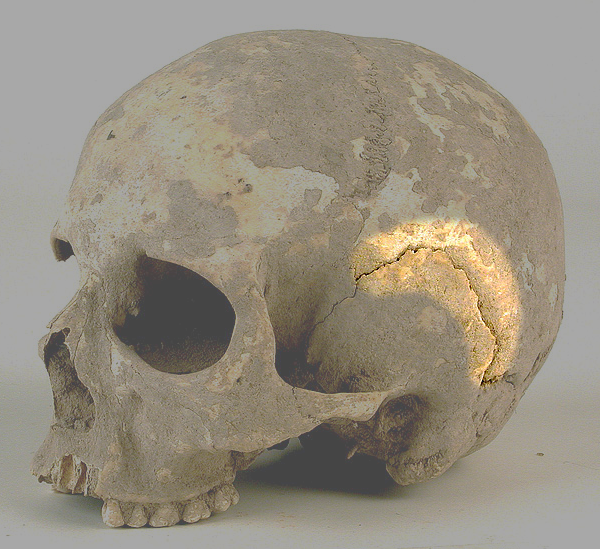
- Side view of the cranium. Squamosal suture highlighted.

Details

Identifiers
- Latin: sutura squamosa cranii
- TA98: A03.1.02.010; A03.0.00.010
- TA2: 1584
- FMA: 52946

The squamosal suture, or squamous suture, arches backward from the pterion and connects the temporal squama with the lower border of the parietal bone: this suture is continuous behind with the short, nearly horizontal parietomastoid suture, which unites the mastoid process of the temporal with the region of the mastoid angle of the parietal bone. The term parietotemporal suture may refer to both of these sutures or exclusively to the parietomastoid suture and its use is, therefore, best avoided.

== Gallery ==
Animation. Left parietal bone removed. Squamosal sutures shown in red.

Parietal bones (above) and temporal bones (below).

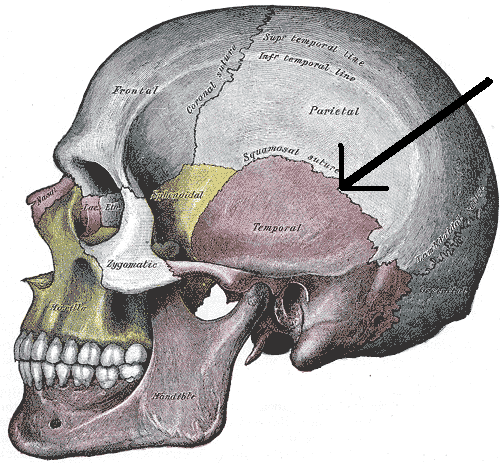
Side view of the skull. Squamosal suture indicated by the black arrows.

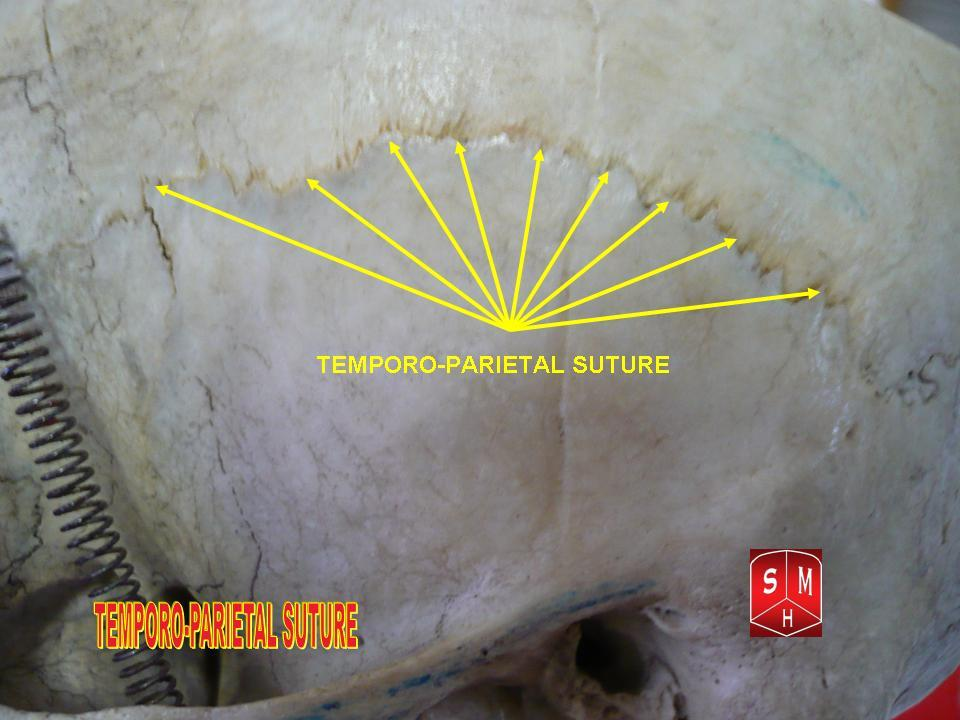
Close up of left temporal bone. Squamosal suture indicated by the yellow arrows.
