= Petrotympanic fissure =

Anatomic feature of the human skull

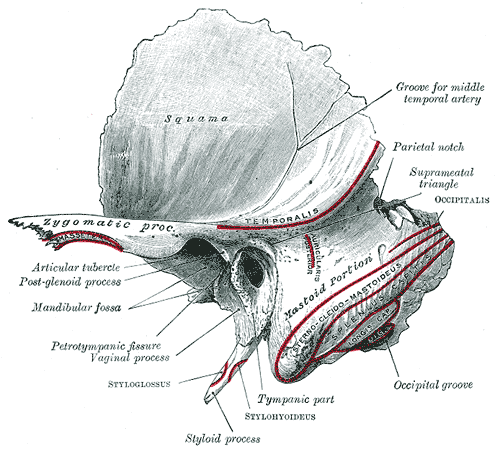
- Left temporal bone. Outer surface. (Petrotympanic fissure is labeled at left, fourth from top.)

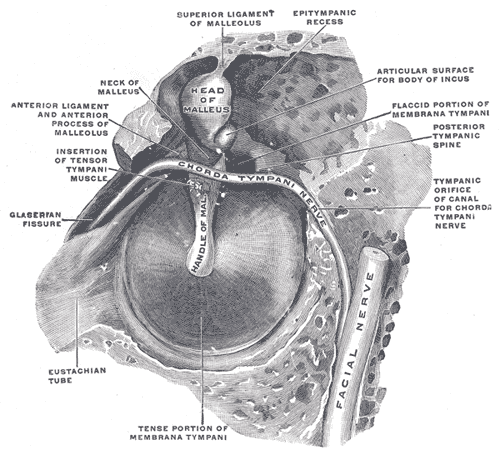
- The right membrana tympani with the malleus and the chorda tympani, viewed from within, from behind, and from above. (Glaserian fissure labeled at center left.)

Details

Identifiers
- Latin: fissura petrotympanica
- TA98: A02.1.06.074
- TA2: 717
- FMA: 55463

The petrotympanic fissure (also known as the glaserian fissure) is a fissure in the temporal bone that runs from the temporomandibular joint to the tympanic cavity.

The mandibular fossa is bounded, in front, by the articular tubercle; behind, by the tympanic part of the bone, which separates it from the external acoustic meatus; it is divided into two parts by a narrow slit, the petrotympanic fissure.

It opens just above and in front of the ring of bone into which the tympanic membrane is inserted; in this situation it is a mere slit about 2 mm. in length. It lodges the anterior process and anterior ligament of the malleus, and gives passage to the anterior tympanic branch of the internal maxillary artery.

== Eponym ==
It is also known as the "Glaserian fissure", after Johann Glaser.

== Contents ==
The contents of the fissure include communications of cranial nerve VII to the infratemporal fossa. A branch of cranial nerve VII, the chorda tympani, runs through the fissure to join with the lingual nerve providing special sensory (taste) innervation to the tongue. Anterior tympanic artery and tympanic veins also pass through the structure. Petrotympanic fissure contains some of the fibers of the anterior ligament of malleus, which run on the base of skull and eventually attach onto the spine of sphenoid bone.

== See also ==
- Chorda tympani
- Petrosquamous suture
