= Johann Glaser =

Swiss anatomist (1629–1675)

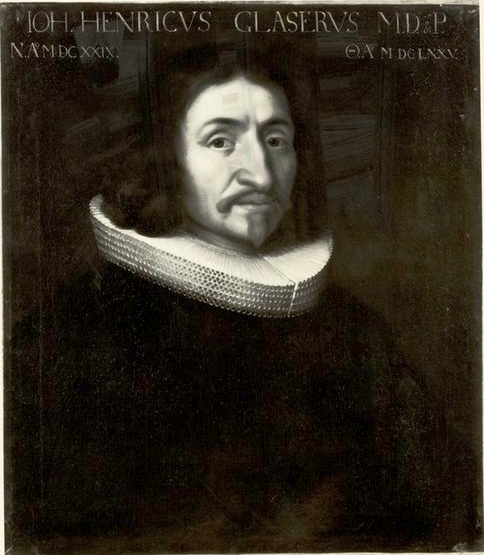

Johann Heinrich Glaser (6 October 1629 – 5 February 1675) was a Swiss anatomist. Known for his anatomical dissections on animals and humans, the Glaserian fissure is named for him.

Glaser was born in Basel, Switzerland where his father was a well-known painter and engraver. He studied locally and went to Geneva where he studied medicine. He then moved to Paris and became interested in botany at the Museum d’Histoire Naturelle. In 1650 he wrote his dissertation De dolore colico. In 1661 he received a doctorate and because of his knowledge of Greek he was appointed professor at 1665 at the Faculté de Médecine, Basel. He moved to the chair of anatomy and botany in 1667. In his Tractatus de cerebro which was published posthumously in 1680 he described a fissure which is named after him as Fissura Glaseri. Glaser gave a funeral oration on the death of Hieronymus Bauhin (1637-1667), son of Caspar Bauhin. Glaser died from a fever infection caught from a patient he was treating.
