= Tympanic cavity =

Small cavity surrounding the bones of the middle ear

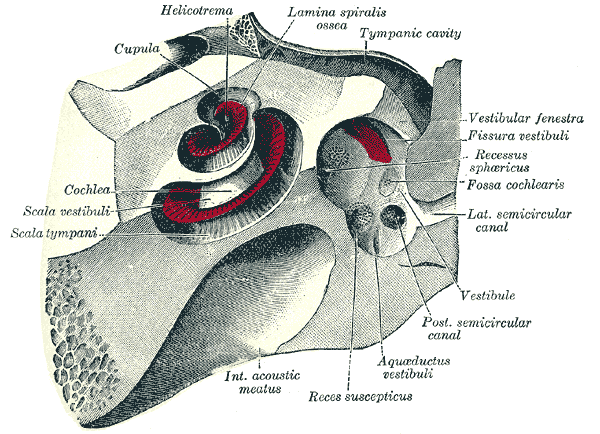
- The cochlea and vestibule, viewed from above. (Tympanic cavity labeled at upper right.)

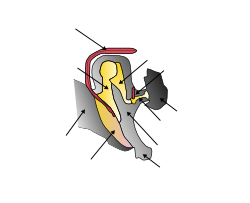
- Bones and muscles in the tympanic cavity in the middle ear

Details
- Precursor: First pharyngeal pouch
- Part of: Middle ear
- Artery: Stylomastoid artery

Identifiers
- Latin: cavitas tympani
- TA98: A02.1.06.051
- TA2: 687
- FMA: 56461

The tympanic cavity is a small cavity surrounding the bones of the middle ear. Within it sit the ossicles, three small bones that transmit vibrations used in the detection of sound.

== Structure ==
On its lateral surface, it abuts the external auditory meatus (ear canal) from which it is separated by the tympanic membrane (eardrum).

=== Walls ===
The tympanic cavity is bounded by:

- Facing the inner ear, the medial wall (or labyrinthic wall, labyrinthine wall) is vertical, and has the oval window and round window, the promontory, and the prominence of the facial canal.
- Facing the outer ear, the lateral wall (or membranous wall), is formed mainly by the tympanic membrane, partly by the ring of bone into which this membrane is inserted. This ring of bone is incomplete at its upper part, forming a notch (notch of Rivinus), close to which are three small apertures: the "iter chordæ posterius", the petrotympanic fissure, and the "iter chordæ anterius". The iter chordæ posterius (apertura tympanica canaliculi chordæ) is situated in the angle of junction between the mastoid and membranous wall of tympanic cavity immediately behind the tympanic membrane and on a level with the upper end of the manubrium of the malleus; it leads into a minute canal, which descends in front of the canal for the facial nerve, and ends in that canal near the stylo-mastoid foramen. Through it the chorda tympani nerve enters the tympanic cavity. The petrotympanic fissure opens just above and in front of the ring of bone into which the tympanic membrane is inserted; in this situation it is a mere slit about 2 mm. in length. It lodges the anterior process and anterior ligament of the malleus, and gives passage to the anterior tympanic branch of the internal maxillary artery. The iter chordæ anterius (canal of Huguier) is placed at the medial end of the petrotympanic fissure; through it the chorda tympani nerve leaves the tympanic cavity.
- The roof of the cavity (also called the tegmental wall, tegmental roof or tegmentum tympani) is formed by a thin plate of bone, the tegmen tympani, which separates the cranial and tympanic cavities. It is situated on the anterior (frontal) surface of the petrous portion of the temporal bone close to its angle of junction with the squama temporalis; it is prolonged backward so as to roof in the tympanic antrum, and forward to cover in the semicanal for the tensor tympani muscle. Its lateral edge corresponds with the remains of the petrosquamous suture. The Atticus is the part of the tegmentum tympani where the stapes and incus are attached.
- The floor of the cavity (also called the jugular wall) is narrow, and consists of a thin plate of bone (fundus tympani) which separates the tympanic cavity from the jugular fossa. It presents, near the labyrinthic wall, a small aperture for the passage of the tympanic branch of the glossopharyngeal nerve.
- The posterior wall (or mastoid wall) is wider above than below, and presents for examination the entrance to the tympanic antrum, the pyramidal eminence, and the fossa incudis.
- The anterior wall (or carotid wall) is wider above than below; it corresponds with the carotid canal, from which it is separated by a thin plate of bone perforated by the tympanic branch of the internal carotid artery, and by the deep petrosal nerve which connects the sympathetic plexus on the internal carotid artery with the tympanic plexus on the promontory. At the upper part of the anterior wall are the orifice of the semicanal for the Tensor tympani muscle and the tympanic orifice of the auditory tube, separated from each other by a thin horizontal plate of bone, the septum canalis musculotubarius. These canals run from the tympanic cavity forward and downward to the retiring angle between the squama and the petrous portion of the temporal bone.

=== Development ===
It is formed from the tubotympanic recess, an expansion of the first pharyngeal pouch.

== Clinical significance ==
If damaged, the tympanic membrane can be repaired in a procedure called tympanoplasty.

Should fluid accumulate within the middle ear as the result of infection or for some other reason, it can be drained by puncturing the tympanic membrane with a large-bore needle (tympanocentesis).

== Additional images ==
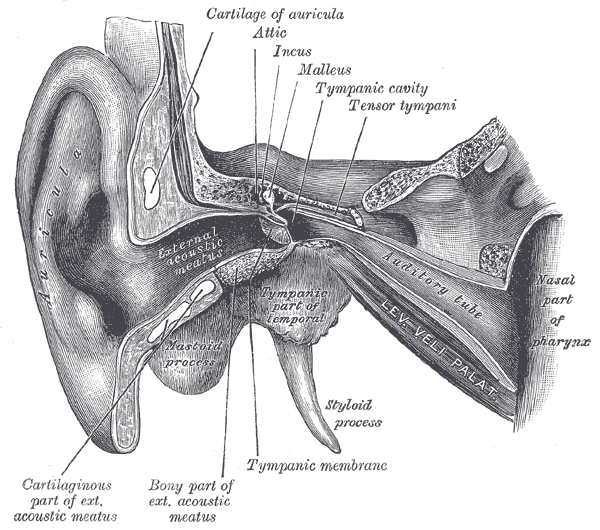
External and middle ear, opened from the front. Right side.

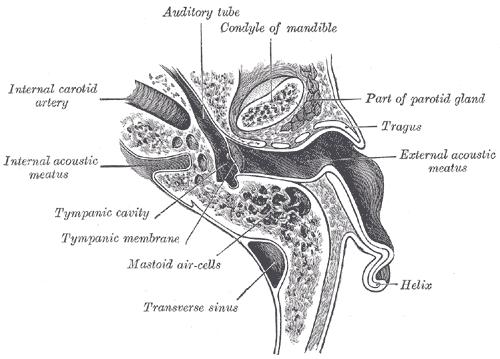
Horizontal section through left ear; upper half of section.

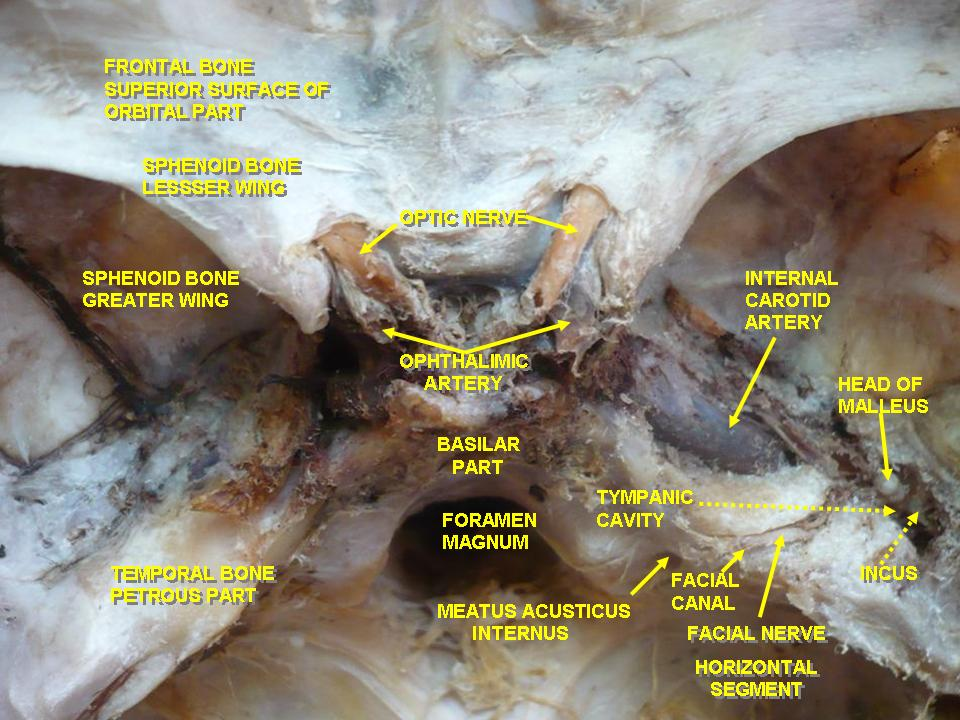
Tympanic cavity. Facial canal. Internal carotid artery.

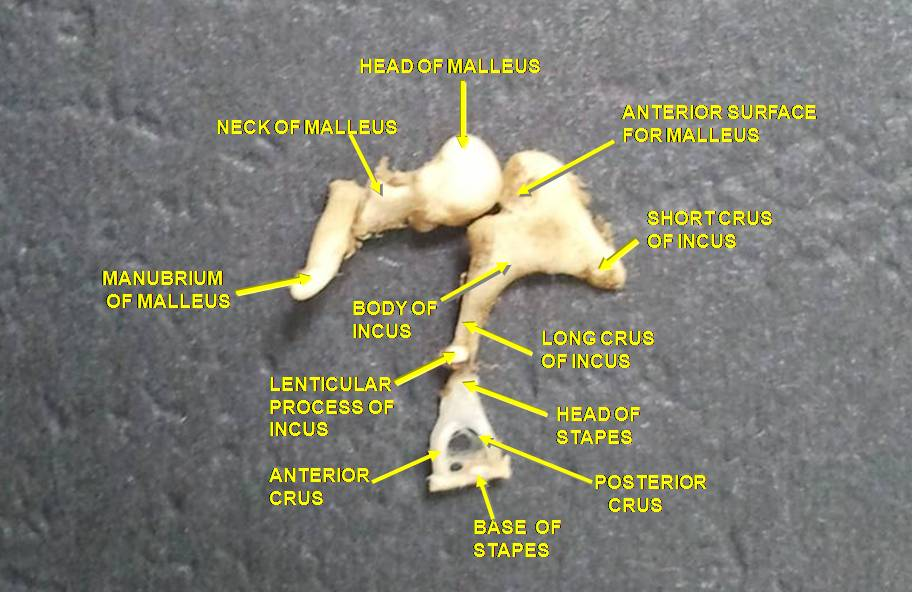
Auditory ossicles. Tympanic cavity. Deep dissection.
