= Koerner's septum =

Anatomic boundary

Koerner's septum is an anatomic boundary in the temporal bone formed by the petrosquamous suture between the petrous and squamosal portions of the mastoid air cells, at the anatomic level of the mastoid antrum. Along with the middle ear ossicles, it is usually eroded in middle ear cholesteatomas. Superiorly, this continues as the petrosquamous suture, a normal anatomic structure that can be mistaken for fractures on temporal bone CT. It is surgically important as it may cause difficulty in locating the antrum and the deeper cells and thus may lead to incomplete removal of disease at mastoidectomy.

== See also ==
- Temporal bone
- Temporal fenestrae
- Temporal muscle
- Temporomandibular joint
