= Articular tubercle =

Bony eminence on the skull

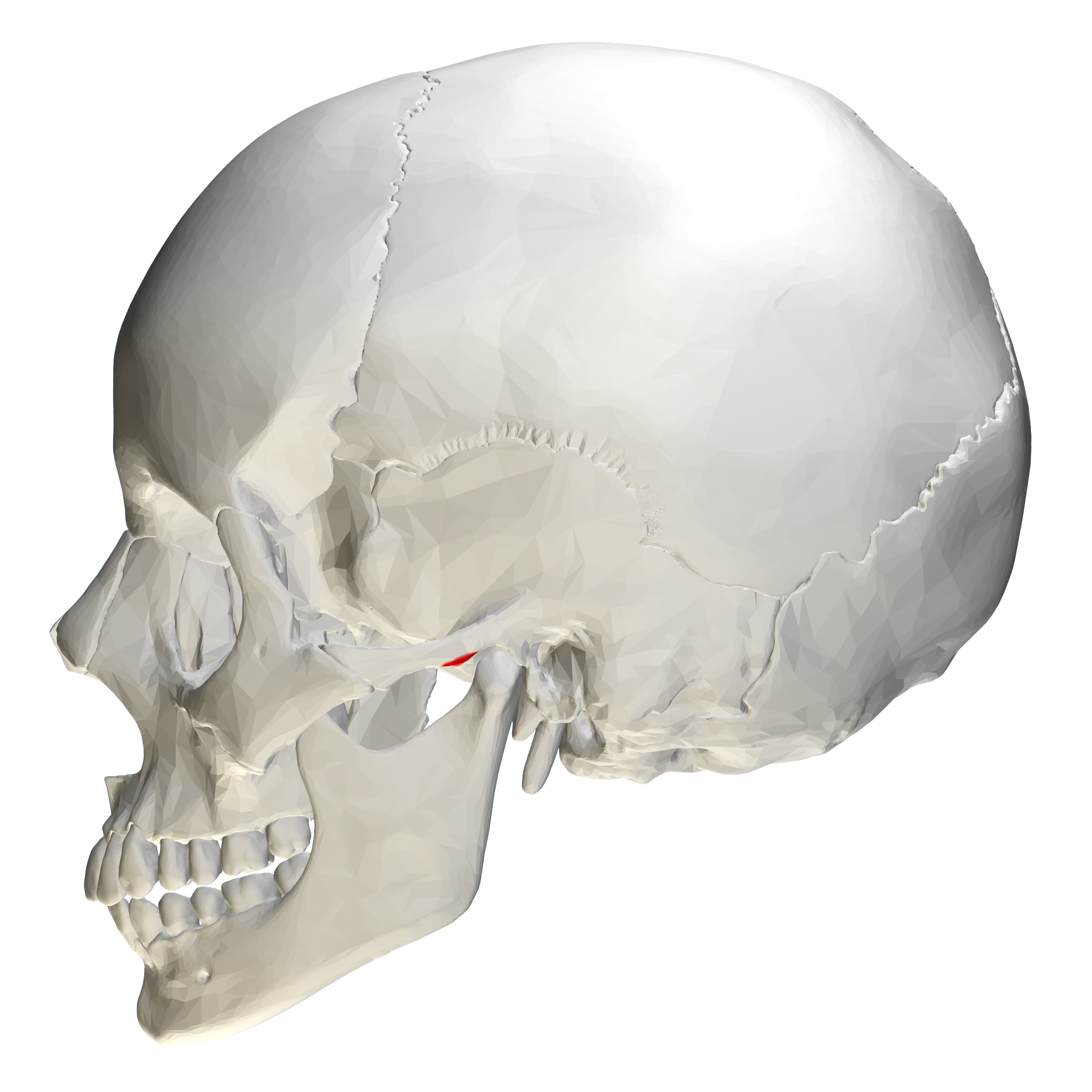
- Left temporal bone seen from outside (articular tubercle is top label at left side)

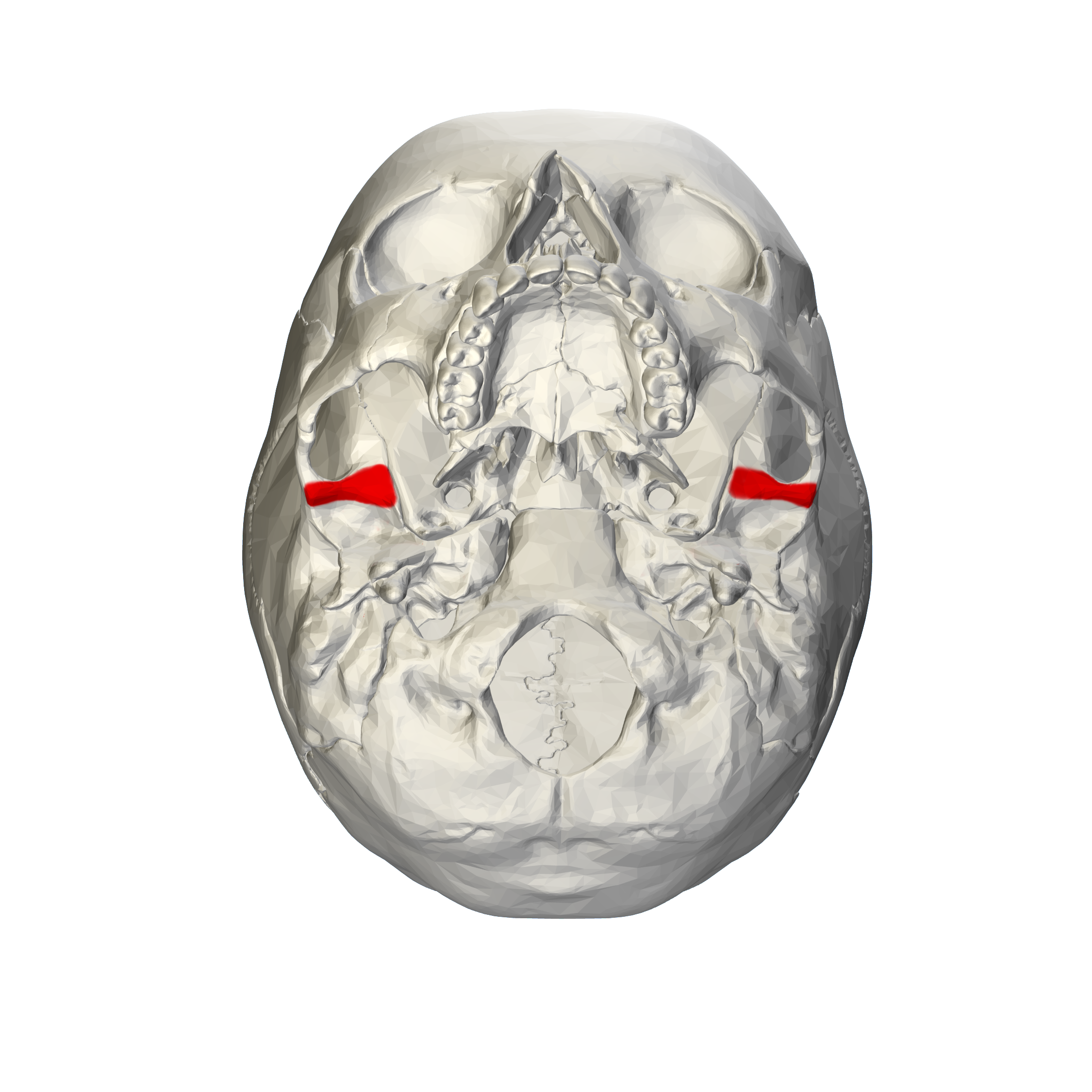
- Base of skull seen from below

Details

Identifiers
- Latin: tuberculum articulare ossis temporalis
- TA98: A02.1.06.073
- TA2: 714
- FMA: 55416

The articular tubercle (eminentia articularis) is a bony eminence on the temporal bone in the skull. It is a rounded eminence of the anterior root of the posterior end of the outer surface of the squama temporalis. This tubercle forms the front boundary of the mandibular fossa, and in the fresh state is covered with cartilage.

The mandibular condyle normally moves over the articular tubercle during physiologic maximal opening of the jaw. The articular tubercle is the site of attachment of the lateral ligament of the temporomandibular joint.
