= Squamous part of temporal bone =

Front and upper part of the sides of the skull base

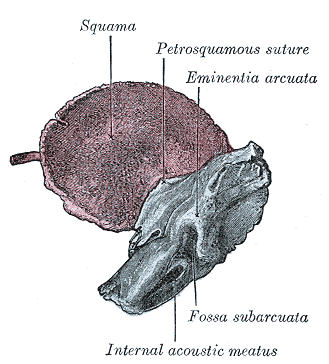
- Temporal bone at birth. Inner aspect.

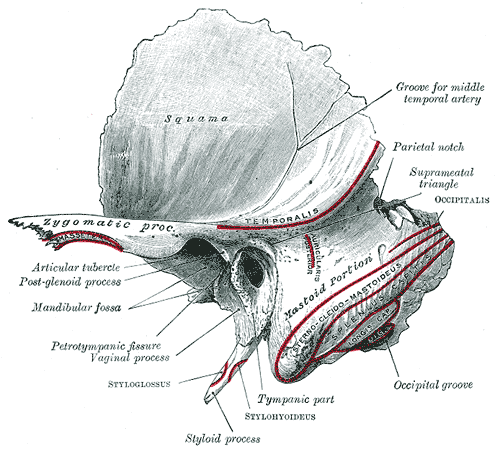
- Left temporal bone. Outer surface. (Squamous part is visible at top left.)

Details

Identifiers
- Latin: pars squamosa ossis temporalis; squama temporalis
- TA98: A02.1.06.061
- TA2: 702
- FMA: 52883

The squamous part of the temporal bone, or temporal squama, forms the front and upper part of the temporal bone, and is scale-like, thin, and translucent.

== Surfaces ==
Its outer surface is smooth and convex; it affords attachment to the temporal muscle, and forms part of the temporal fossa; on its hinder part is a vertical groove for the middle temporal artery. A curved line, the temporal line, or supramastoid crest, runs backward and upward across its posterior part; it serves for the attachment of the temporal fascia, and limits the origin of the temporalis muscle. The boundary between the squamous part and the mastoid portion of the bone, as indicated by traces of the original suture, lies about 1 cm. below this line.

Projecting from the lower part of the squamous part is a long, arched process, the zygomatic process. This process is at first directed lateralward, its two surfaces looking upward and downward; it then appears as if twisted inward upon itself, and runs forward, its surfaces now looking medialward and lateralward. The superior border is long, thin, and sharp, and serves for the attachment of the temporal fascia; the inferior, short, thick, and arched, has attached to it some fibers of the masseter. The lateral surface is convex and subcutaneous; the medial is concave, and affords attachment to the masseter. The anterior end is deeply serrated and articulates with the zygomatic bone. The posterior end is connected to the squamous part by two roots, the anterior and posterior roots. The posterior root, a prolongation of the upper border, is strongly marked; it runs backward above the external auditory meatus, and is continuous with the temporal line. The anterior root, continuous with the lower border, is short but broad and strong; it is directed medialward and ends in a rounded eminence, the articular tubercle (eminentia articularis).

This tubercle forms the front boundary of the mandibular fossa, and in the fresh state is covered with cartilage. In front of the articular tubercle is a small triangular area which assists in forming the infratemporal fossa; this area is separated from the outer surface of the squamous part by a ridge which is continuous behind with the anterior root of the zygomatic process, and in front, in the articulated skull, with the infratemporal crest on the great wing of the sphenoid. Between the posterior wall of the external acoustic meatus and the posterior root of the zygomatic process is the area called the suprameatal triangle (Macewen), or mastoid fossa, through which an instrument may be pushed into the tympanic antrum.

At the junction of the anterior root with the zygomatic process is a projection for the attachment of the temporomandibular ligament; and behind the anterior root is an oval depression, forming part of the mandibular fossa, for the reception of the condyle of the mandible. The mandibular fossa (glenoid fossa) is bounded, in front, by the articular tubercle; behind, by the tympanic part of the bone, which separates it from the external acoustic meatus; it is divided into two parts by a narrow slit, the petrotympanic fissure (Glaserian fissure). The anterior part, formed by the squamous part, is smooth, covered in the fresh state with cartilage, and articulates with the condyle of the mandible. Behind this part of the fossa is a small conical eminence; this is the representative of a prominent tubercle which, in some mammals, descends behind the condyle of the mandible, and prevents its backward displacement. The posterior part of the mandibular fossa, formed by the tympanic part of the bone, is non-articular, and sometimes lodges a portion of the parotid gland.

The petrotympanic fissure leads into the middle ear or tympanic cavity; it lodges the anterior process of the malleus, and transmits the tympanic branch of the internal maxillary artery. The chorda tympani nerve passes through a canal (canal of Huguier), separated from the anterior edge of the petrotympanic fissure by a thin scale of bone and situated on the lateral side of the auditory tube, in the retiring angle between the squamous part and the petrous portion of the temporal bone.

The internal surface of the squamous part is concave; it presents depressions corresponding to the convolutions of the temporal lobe of the brain, and grooves for the branches of the middle meningeal vessels.

== Borders ==
The superior border is thin, and bevelled at the expense of the internal table, so as to overlap the squamous border of the parietal bone, forming with it the squamosal suture. Posteriorly, the superior border forms an angle, the parietal notch, with the mastoid portion of the bone.

The antero-inferior border is thick, serrated, and bevelled at the expense of the inner table above and of the outer below, for articulation with the great wing of the sphenoid.

== Additional images ==
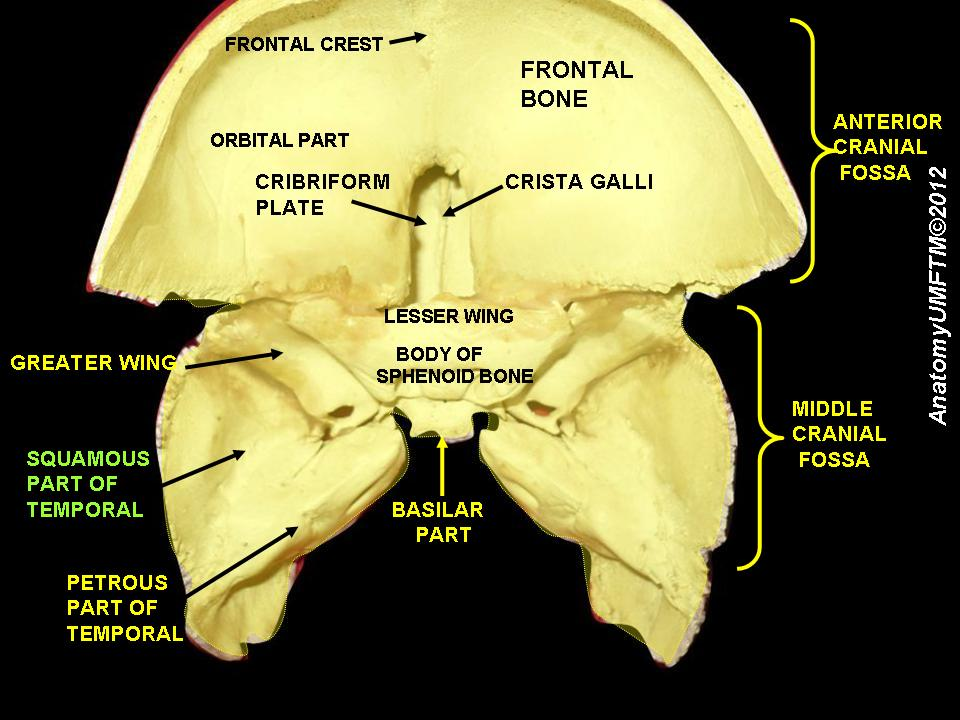
Squama temporalis

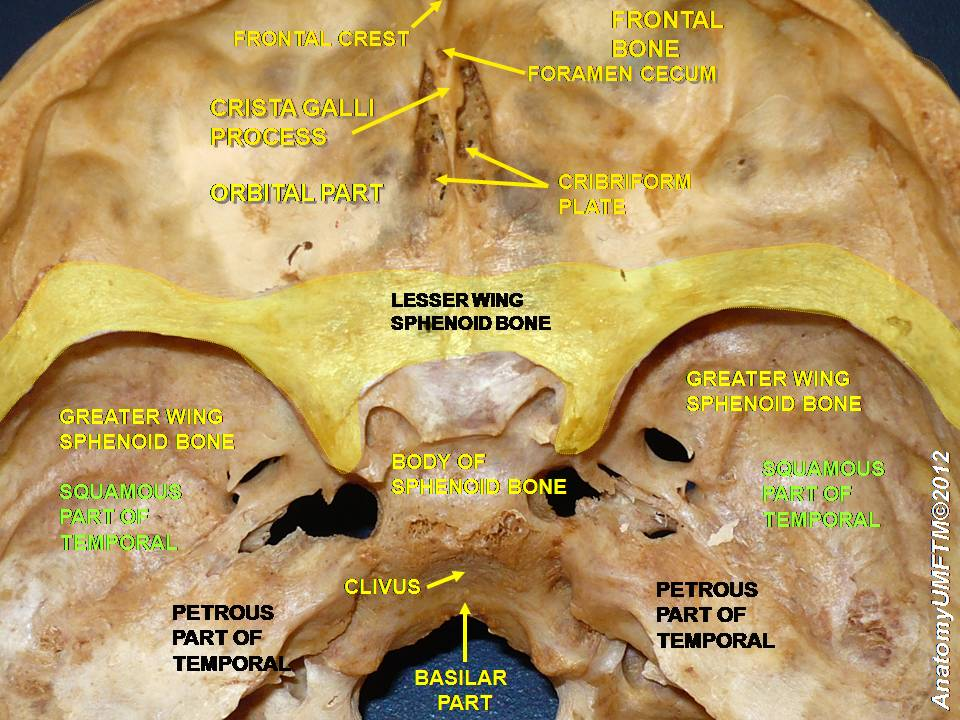
Squama temporalis

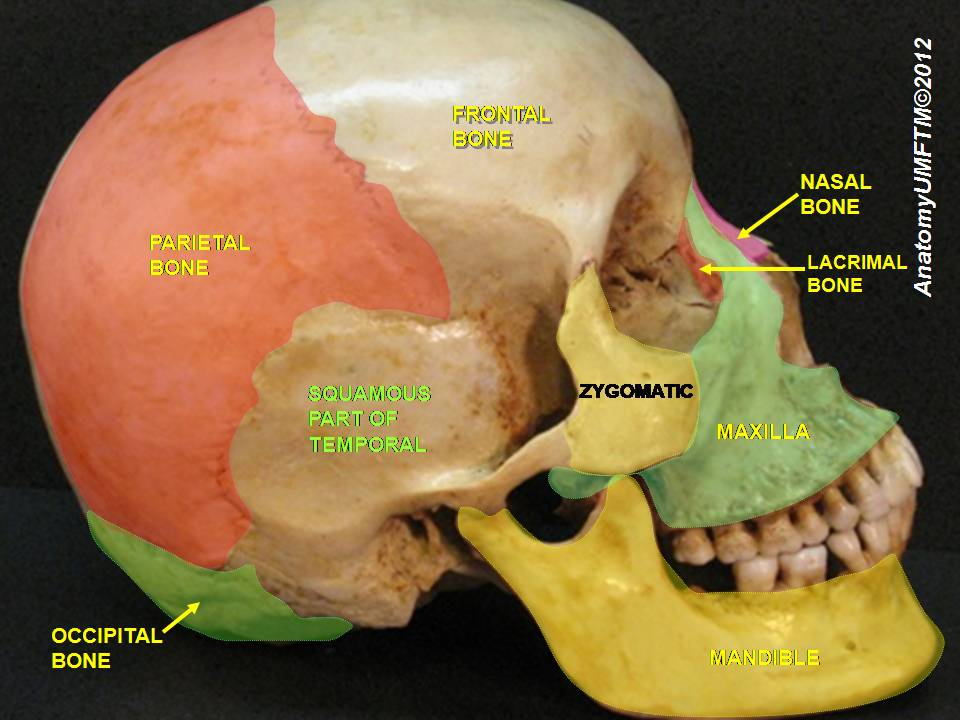
Squama temporalis
