= Mandibular fossa =

Depression in the temporal bone that articulates with the mandible

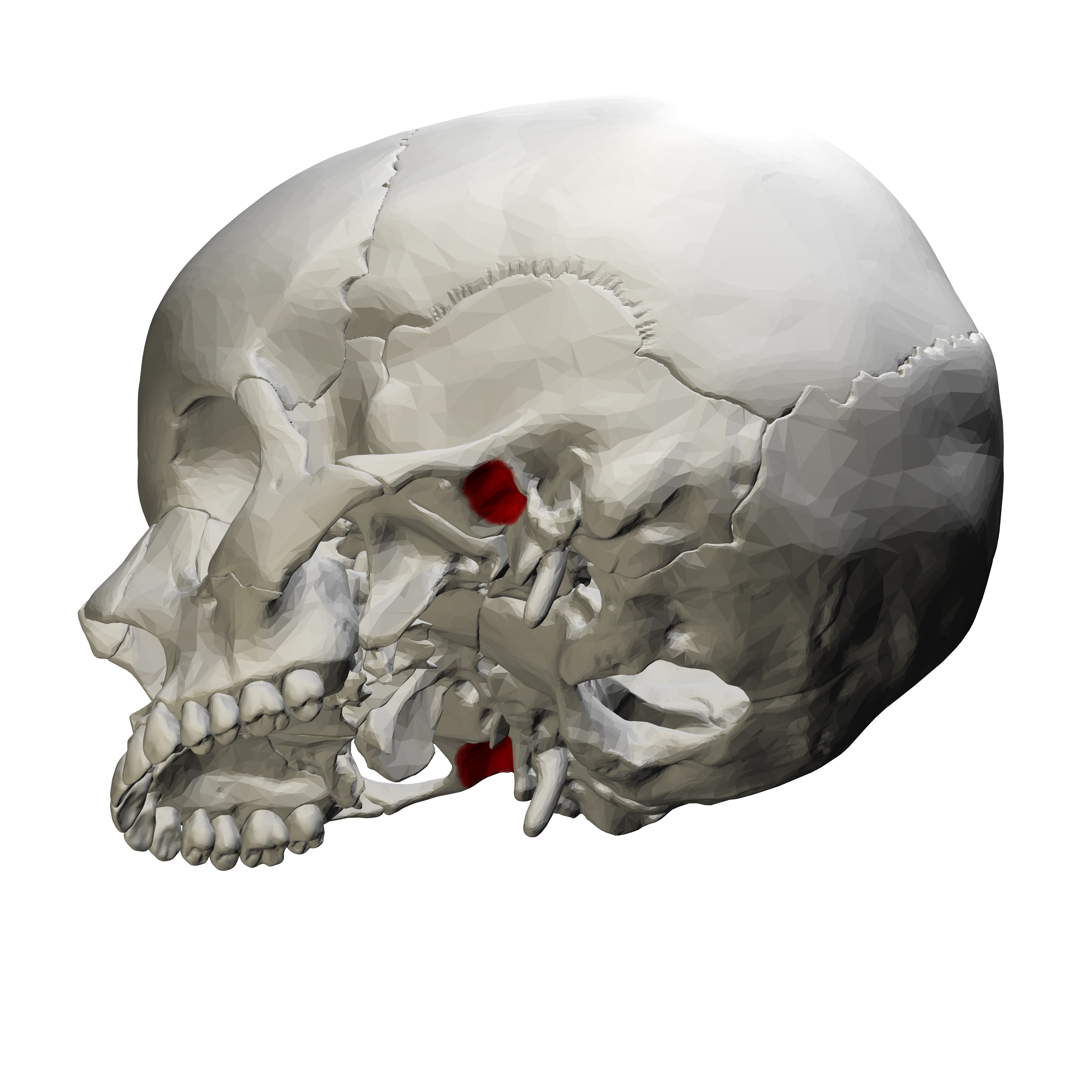
- Left temporal bone. Outer surface. (Mandibular fossa labeled at left, third from the top.)

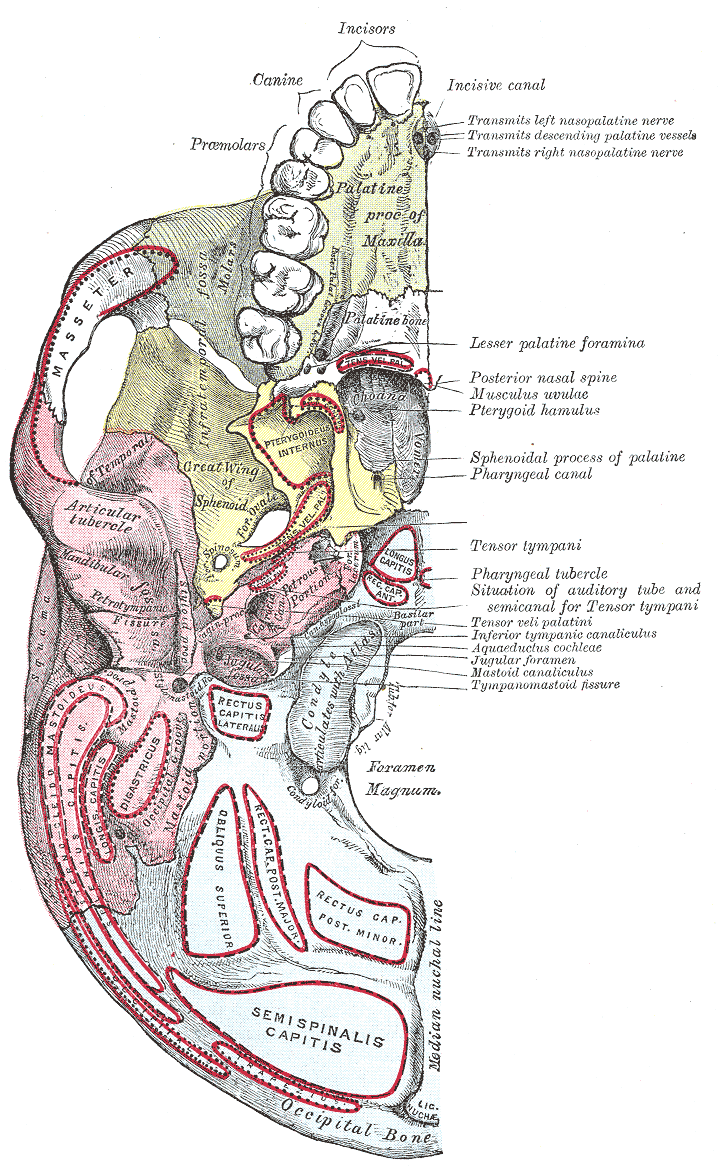
- Base of skull. Inferior surface. (Mandibular fossa labeled at center left. Temporal bone is pink.)

Details
- Part of: Temporal bone
- System: Skeletal

Identifiers
- Latin: fossa mandibularis
- TA98: A02.1.06.071
- TA2: 712
- FMA: 75313

The mandibular fossa, also known as the glenoid fossa in some dental literature, is the depression in the temporal bone that articulates with the mandible.

== Structure ==
In the temporal bone, the mandibular fossa is bounded anteriorly by the articular tubercle and posteriorly by the tympanic portion of the temporal bone, which separates it from the external acoustic meatus. The fossa is divided into two parts by a narrow slit, the petrotympanic fissure (Glaserian fissure). It is concave in shape to receive the condyloid process of the mandible.

=== Development ===
The mandibular fossa develops from condylar cartilage. This may be stimulated by SOX9 or ALK2, as has been seen in mouse models.

== Function ==
The condyloid process of the mandible articulates with the temporal bone of the skull at the mandibular fossa.

== Clinical significance ==
Problems with morphogenesis during embryonic development can lead to the mandibular fossa not forming. This may be caused by mutations to SOX9 or ALK2.

If the mandibular fossa is very shallow, this can cause problems with the strength of the temporomandibular joint. This can lead to easy subluxation of the joint and trismus (lock jaw). Deformation of the mandibular fossa, often part of temporomandibular dysplasia, causes similar problems in dogs. This may resolve spontaneously, or require surgery.

== History ==
The mandibular fossa is also known as the glenoid fossa in some dental literature.

== Other animals ==
The mandibular fossa is a feature of the skulls of various other animals, including dogs.

== See also ==
- Temporomandibular joint
