= Pain management =

Interdisciplinary approach for easing pain

Pain Medicine Physician
Occupation
- Names: Physician
- Occupation type: Specialty
- Activity sectors: Medicine

Description
- Education required: Doctor of Medicine (M.D.); Doctor of Osteopathic medicine (D.O.); Bachelor of Medicine, Bachelor of Surgery (M.B.B.S.); Bachelor of Medicine, Bachelor of Surgery (MBChB)
- Fields of employment: Hospitals, clinics

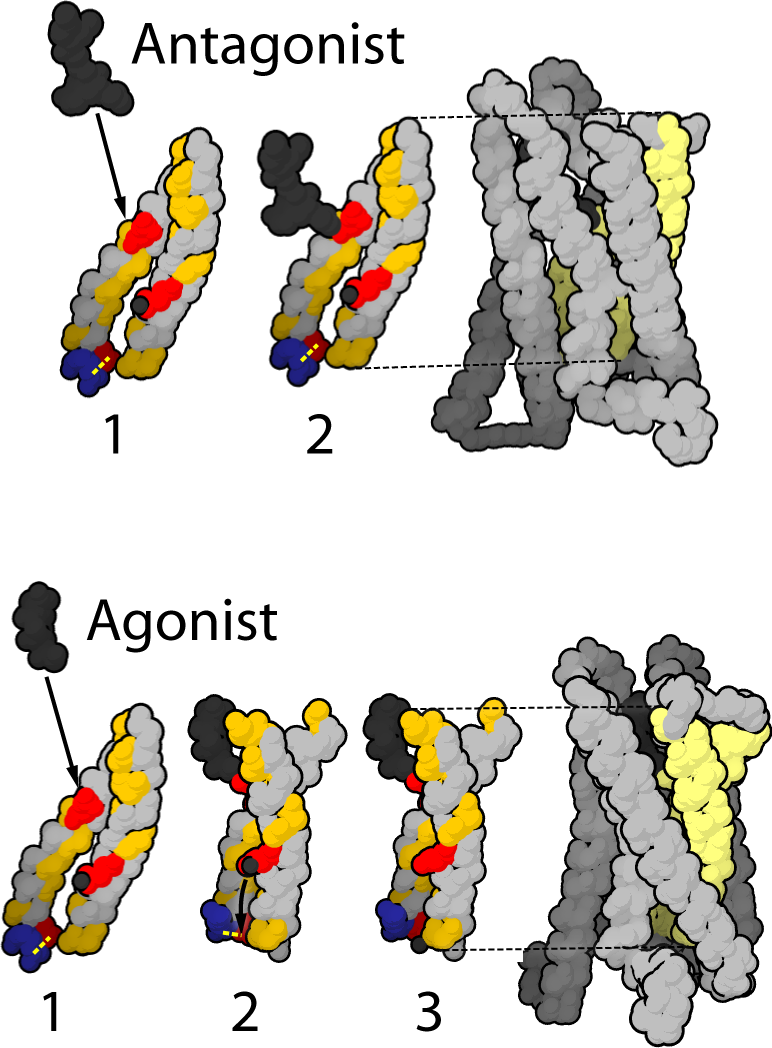
Active and inactive μ-opioid receptors

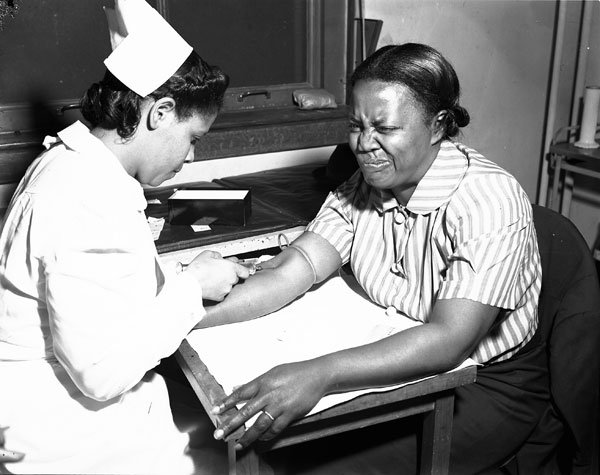
Image of visual pain

Pain management is an aspect of medicine and health care involving relief of pain (pain relief, analgesia, pain control) in various dimensions, from acute and simple to chronic and challenging. Most physicians and other health professionals provide some pain control in the normal course of their practice, and for the more complex instances of pain, they also call on additional help from a specific medical specialty devoted to pain, which is called pain medicine.

Pain management often uses a interdisciplinary approach for easing the suffering and improving the quality of life of anyone experiencing pain, whether acute pain or chronic pain. Relieving pain (analgesia) is typically an acute process, while managing chronic pain involves additional complexities and ideally an interdisciplinary approach.

A typical multidisciplinary pain management team may include: medical practitioners, pharmacists, clinical psychologists, physiotherapists, occupational therapists, recreational therapists, physician assistants, nurses, and dentists. The team may also include other mental health specialists and massage therapists. Pain sometimes resolves quickly once the underlying trauma or pathology has healed, and is treated by one practitioner, with drugs such as pain relievers (analgesics) and occasionally also anxiolytics.

Effective management of chronic (long-term) pain, however, frequently requires the coordinated efforts of the pain management team. Effective pain management does not always mean total eradication of all pain. Rather, it often means achieving an adequate quality of life in the presence of pain, through any combination of lessening the pain/or better understanding it, and living happily despite it. Medicine treats injuries and diseases to support and speed healing. It treats distressing symptoms such as pain and discomfort to reduce any suffering during treatment, healing, and dying.

The task of medicine is to relieve suffering under three circumstances. The first is when a painful injury or pathology is resistant to treatment and persists. The second is when pain persists after the injury or pathology has healed. Finally, the third circumstance is when medical science cannot identify the cause of pain. Treatment approaches to chronic pain include pharmacological measures, such as analgesics (pain killer drugs), antidepressants, and anticonvulsants; interventional procedures, physical therapy, physical exercise, application of ice or heat; and psychological measures, such as biofeedback and cognitive behavioral therapy.

== Defining pain ==
In the nursing profession, one common definition of pain is any problem that is "whatever the experiencing person says it is, existing whenever the experiencing person says it does".

Pain management includes patient and communication about the pain problem. To define the pain problem, a health care provider will likely ask questions such as:

- How intense is the pain?
- How does the pain feel?
- Where is the pain?
- What, if anything, makes the pain lessen?
- What, if anything, makes the pain increase?
- When did the pain start?

After asking such questions, the health care provider will have a description of the pain. Pain is often rated on a scale from 1 to 10, known as the Numeric Rating Scale (NRS);

- Zero equaling no pain
- One to three equaling mild pain (nagging, annoying, interfering little with activities of daily living)
- Four to six equaling moderate pain (interferes significantly with ADLs)
- Seven to 10 equaling severe pain (disabling; unable to perform ADLs)

This pain scale is based on a person reporting their pain intensity, with zero representing no pain experienced and 10 indicating the worst possible pain. The NRS is a common tool used by clinicians and in research to understand personal pain levels and monitor changes over time. In the clinical context, pain management will then be used to address that pain.

== Adverse effects ==
There are many types of pain management. Each have their own benefits, drawbacks, and limits.

A common challenge in pain management is communication between the health care provider and the person experiencing pain. People experiencing pain may have difficulty recognizing or describing what they feel and how intense it is. Health care providers and patients may have difficulty communicating with each other about how pain responds to treatments. There is a risk in many types of pain management for the patient to take treatment that is less effective than needed or which causes other difficulties and side effects. Some treatments for pain can be harmful if overused. A goal of pain management for the patient and their health care provider is to identify the amount of treatment needed to address the pain without going beyond that limit.

Another problem with pain management is that pain is the body's natural way of communicating a problem. Pain is supposed to resolve as the body heals itself with time and pain management. Sometimes pain management covers a problem, and the patient might be less aware that they need treatment for a deeper problem.

== Physical approaches ==
=== Physical medicine and rehabilitation ===
Physical medicine and rehabilitation (PM&R), a medical specialty, uses a range of physical techniques, such as heat therapy and electrotherapy, as well as therapeutic exercises and behavioral therapy in the management of pain. PM&R techniques are usually part of an interdisciplinary program that might also include pharmaceuticals. Spa therapy has shown positive effects in reducing pain among patients with chronic low back pain, but its evidence base is limited. Studies have shown that elastic therapeutic tape can be used to reduce chronic low back pain. The Centers for Disease Control and Prevention recommended that physical therapy and exercise be prescribed as first-line treatments (rather than opioids) for multiple causes of chronic pain in 2016 guidelines. Applicable disorders include chronic low back pain, osteoarthritis of the hip and knee, and fibromyalgia. Exercise alone or with other rehabilitation disciplines (including psychotherapeutic approaches) can have a positive effect on pain. Besides improving the experience of pain itself, exercise can also improve individuals' well-being and general health.

Manual and joint mobilization therapies are considered safe interventions for low back pain, with manual therapy potentially offering a larger therapeutic effect.

Specifically in chronic low back pain, education about how the brain processes pain, in conjunction with routine physiotherapy interventions, may provide short-term relief of disability and pain.

=== Exercise interventions ===
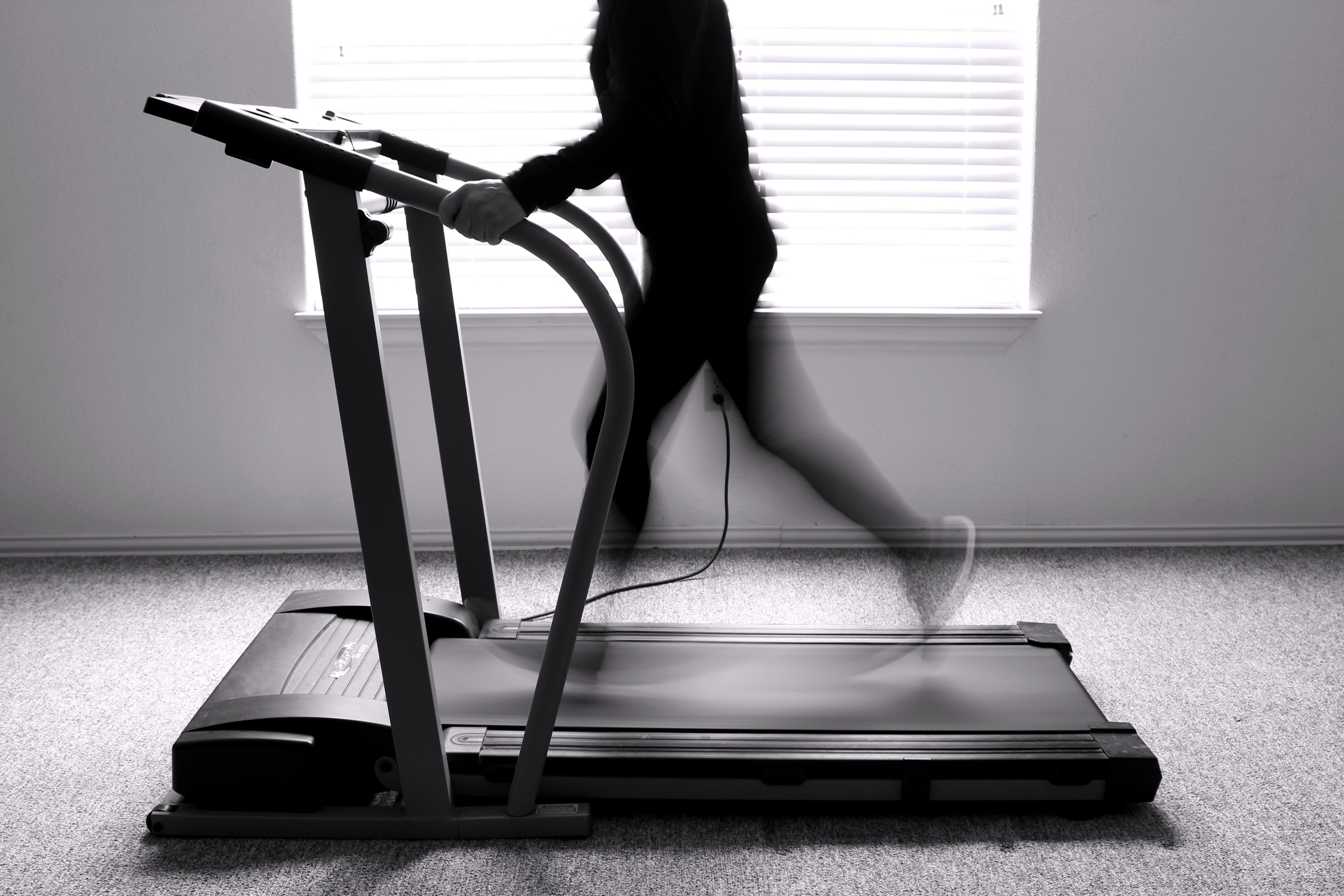
Aerobic exercise can help when it comes to pain management

Physical activity interventions, such as tai chi, yoga, and pilates, promote harmony between the mind and body through total-body awareness. These practices incorporate breathing techniques, meditation, and a wide variety of movements while training the body to perform functionally by increasing strength, flexibility, and range of motion. Physical activity can also benefit people with chronic pain by reducing inflammation and sensitivity and boosting overall energy. Physical activity and exercise may improve chronic pain, and overall quality of life, while minimizing the need for pain medications. More specifically, walking has been effective in improving pain management in chronic low back pain.

=== Transcutaneous electrical nerve stimulation ===
Transcutaneous electrical nerve stimulation (TENS) is a self-operated, portable device intended to help manage chronic pain through electrical impulses. Limited research has explored the effectiveness of TENS in relation to pain management of multiple sclerosis (MS). MS is a chronic autoimmune neurological disorder that involves demyelination of nerve axons and disruption of nerve conduction velocity and efficiency. In one study, electrodes were placed over the lumbar spine, and participants received treatment twice a day and at any time when they experienced a painful episode. This study found that TENS would benefit MS patients with localized or limited symptoms in one limb. The research is mixed on whether or not TENS helps manage pain in MS patients.

Transcutaneous electrical nerve stimulation is ineffective for lower back pain, but it may help with diabetic neuropathy.

==== Transcranial direct current stimulation ====
Transcranial direct current stimulation (tDCS) is a non-invasive technique of brain stimulation that can modulate activity in specific brain cortex regions, and it involves the application of low-intensity (up to 2 mA) constant direct current to the scalp through electrodes in order to modulate the excitability of large cortical areas. tDCS may have a role in pain assessment by contributing to efforts in distinguishing between somatic and affective aspects of pain experience. Zaghi and colleagues (2011) found that the motor cortex, when stimulated with tDCS, increases the threshold for both the perception of non-painful and painful stimuli. Although there is a greater need for research examining the mechanism of electrical stimulation in pain treatment, one theory suggests that the changes in thalamic activity may be due to the influence of motor cortex stimulation on the decrease in pain sensations.

Concerning MS, a study found that daily tDCS sessions resulted in an individual's subjective report of pain decreased when compared to a sham condition. In addition, the study found a similar improvement at 1 to 3 days before and after each tDCS session.

Research examining tDCS for pain treatment in fibromyalgia has found initial evidence for pain decreases. Specifically, the stimulation of the primary motor cortex resulted in significantly greater pain improvement in comparison to the control group (e.g., sham stimulation, stimulation of the DLPFC). However, this effect decreased after treatment ended, but remained significant for three weeks following the extinction of treatment.

=== Acupuncture ===
Acupuncture involves the insertion and manipulation of needles into specific points on the body to relieve pain or for therapeutic purposes. An analysis of the 13 highest quality studies of pain treatment with acupuncture, published in January 2009 in the British Medical Journal, was unable to quantify the difference in the effect on pain of real, sham, and no acupuncture. A systematic review in 2019 reported that acupuncture injection therapy was an effective treatment for patients with nonspecific chronic low back pain, and is widely used in Southeast Asian countries.

=== Light therapy ===
Research has found that light therapy, such as low-level laser therapy, is effective in relieving low back pain. Instead of thermal therapy, where energy is originated through heat, low-level light therapy (LLLT) utilizes photochemical reactions requiring light to function. One study conducted by Stausholm et al. showed that at certain infrared wavelengths, LLLT reduced pain in participants with knee osteoarthritis.

=== Sound therapy ===
Audioanalgesia and music therapy are both examples of the use of auditory stimuli to manage pain or other distress. They are generally viewed as insufficient when used alone but also as helpful adjuncts to other forms of therapy.

=== Interventional procedures ===
Interventional radiology procedures for pain control, typically used for chronic back pain, include epidural steroid injections, facet joint injections, neurolytic blocks, spinal cord stimulators and intrathecal drug delivery system implants.

Pulsed radiofrequency, neuromodulation, direct introduction of medication, and nerve ablation may be used to target either the tissue structures and organs or systems responsible for persistent nociception or the nociceptors from the structures implicated as the source of chronic pain. Radiofrequency treatment has been seen to improve pain in patients with facet joint low back pain. However, continuous radiofrequency is more effective in managing pain than pulsed radiofrequency.

An intrathecal pump is sometimes used to deliver very small amounts of medication directly into the spinal fluid. This is similar to epidural infusions used in labour and postoperatively. The major differences are that it is much more common for the drug to be delivered into the spinal fluid (intrathecal) rather than epidurally, and the pump can be fully implanted under the skin.

A spinal cord stimulator is an implantable medical device that generates electrical impulses and delivers them near the dorsal surface of the spinal cord, providing a paresthesia ("tingling") sensation that alters the patient's perception of pain.

=== Intra-articular ozone therapy ===
Intra-articular ozone therapy has been shown to effectively alleviate chronic pain in patients with knee osteoarthritis.

== Psychological approaches ==
=== Acceptance and commitment therapy ===
Acceptance and commitment therapy (ACT) is a type of cognitive behavioral therapy that emphasizes behavior modification over symptom reduction, focusing on changing the context of psychological experiences and employing experiential behavior change methods. The central process in ACT revolves around psychological flexibility, which in turn includes processes of acceptance; awareness; present-oriented mindfulness in interacting with experiences; an ability to persist or change behavior; and an ability to be guided by one's values. ACT has robust evidence in the scientific literature for a range of health and behavior problems, including chronic pain. ACT facilitates the dual processes of acceptance and behavioral change, enabling patients to cultivate psychological flexibility. This approach allows for a more dynamic and adaptable focus in therapeutic interventions, enhancing overall treatment effectiveness.

Recent research has applied ACT successfully to chronic pain in older adults due in part to its direction from individual values and being highly customizable to any stage of life. In line with the therapeutic model of ACT, significant increases in process variables, pain acceptance, and mindfulness were also observed in a study applying ACT to chronic pain in older adults. In addition, these primary results suggested that an ACT-based treatment may significantly improve levels of physical disability, psychosocial disability, and depression post-treatment and at a three-month follow-up for older adults with chronic pain.

=== Cognitive behavioral therapy ===
Cognitive behavioral therapy (CBT) in the setting of pain management aims to aid individuals in understanding the relationship between their pain, thoughts, emotions, and behaviors. A main goal in treatment is cognitive (i.e., thinking, reasoning, and remembering) restructuring to encourage helpful thought patterns. This will target healthy activities such as regular exercise and pacing. Lifestyle changes are also trained to improve sleep patterns and to develop better coping skills for pain and other stressors using various techniques (e.g., relaxation, diaphragmatic breathing, and even biofeedback).

Studies have demonstrated the usefulness of cognitive behavioral therapy in the management of chronic low back pain, producing significant decreases in physical and psychosocial disability. CBT is significantly more effective than standard care in treatment of people with body-wide pain, like fibromyalgia. Evidence for the usefulness of CBT in the management of adult chronic pain is generally poorly understood, due partly to the proliferation of techniques of doubtful quality, and the poor quality of reporting in clinical trials. The crucial content of individual interventions has not been isolated, and the important contextual elements, such as therapist training and development of treatment manuals, have not been determined. The widely varying nature of the resulting data makes useful systematic review and meta-analysis within the field very difficult.

In 2020, a systematic review of randomized controlled trials (RCTs) evaluated the clinical effectiveness of psychological therapies for the management of adult chronic pain (excluding headaches). There is no evidence that behaviour therapy (BT) is effective in reducing this type of pain; however, BT may be useful for improving a person's mood immediately after treatment. This improvement appears to be small and short-term. CBT may have a small positive short-term effect on pain immediately following treatment. CBT may also have a small effect on reducing disability and potential catastrophizing that may be associated with adult chronic pain. These benefits do not appear to last very long following the therapy. CBT may contribute towards improving the mood of an adult who experiences chronic pain, which could be maintained for more extended periods of time.

For children and adolescents, a review of RCTs evaluating the effectiveness of psychological therapy for the management of chronic and recurrent pain found that psychological treatments are effective in reducing pain when people under 18 years old have headaches. This beneficial effect may be maintained for at least three months following the therapy. Psychological treatments may also improve pain control for children or adolescents who experience pain unrelated to headaches. It is not known if psychological therapy improves a child's or an adolescent's mood and the potential for disability related to their chronic pain.

=== Hypnosis ===
A 2007 review of 13 studies found evidence for the efficacy of hypnosis in reducing pain in some conditions. However, the studies had limitations, like small study sizes, raising issues of power to detect group differences, and lacking credible controls for placebo or expectation. The authors concluded that "although the findings provide support for the general applicability of hypnosis in the treatment of chronic pain, considerably more research will be needed to fully determine the effects of hypnosis for different chronic-pain conditions".

Hypnosis has reduced the pain of some harmful medical procedures in children and adolescents. In clinical trials addressing other patient groups, it has significantly reduced pain compared to no treatment or some other non-hypnotic interventions. The effects of self-hypnosis on chronic pain are roughly comparable to those of progressive muscle relaxation.

A 2019 systematic review of 85 studies showed it to be significantly effective at reducing pain for people with high and medium suggestibility, but minimal effectiveness for people with low suggestibility. However, high-quality clinical data is needed to generalize to the whole chronic pain population.

=== Mindfulness meditation ===
A 2013 meta-analysis of studies that used techniques centered around the concept of mindfulness concluded, "that MBIs [mindfulness-based interventions] decrease the intensity of pain for chronic pain patients". A 2019 review of studies of brief mindfulness-based interventions (BMBI) concluded that BMBI are not recommended as a first-line treatment and could not confirm their efficacy in managing chronic or acute pain.

=== Mindfulness-based pain management ===
Mindfulness-based pain management (MBPM) is a mindfulness-based intervention providing specific applications for people living with chronic pain and illness. Adapting the core concepts and practices of mindfulness-based stress reduction and mindfulness-based cognitive therapy, MBPM includes a distinctive emphasis on the practice of "Maitrī", or loving-kindness, and has been seen as sensitive to concerns about removing mindfulness teaching from its original ethical framework within Buddhism. It was developed by Vidyamala Burch and is delivered through the programs of Breathworks.

== Medications ==
The World Health Organization (WHO) recommends a pain ladder for managing pain relief with pharmaceuticals. It was first described for use in cancer pain, but can be used by medical professionals as a general principle when managing any type of pain. In the treatment of chronic pain, the three-step WHO Analgesic Ladder provides guidelines for selecting the appropriate medicine. The exact medications recommended will vary by country and individual treatment centers, but the following provides an example of the WHO approach to treating chronic pain with medications. If at any point treatment fails to provide adequate pain relief, the doctor and patient proceed to the next step.

Common types of pain and typical drug management
Pain type	typical initial drug treatment	comments
Headache	Paracetamol, nonsterodial anti-inflammatory drugs (NSAIDs)	Doctor consultation is appropriate if headaches are severe, persistent, accompanied by fever, vomiting, or speech or balance problems; self-medication should be limited to two weeks
Migraine	Paracetamol, NSAIDs	Triptans are used when the others do not work, or when migraines are frequent or severe
Menstrual cramps	NSAIDs	Some NSAIDs are marketed specifically for cramps, but any NSAID works
Minor trauma, such as a bruise, abrasion, or sprain	Paracetamol, NSAIDs	Opioids not recommended
Severe trauma, such as a wound, burn, bone fracture, or severe sprain	Opioids	More than two weeks of pain requiring opioid treatment is unusual
Strain or pulled muscle	NSAIDs, muscle relaxants	If inflammation is involved, NSAIDs may work better; short-term use only
Minor pain after surgery	Paracetamol, NSAIDs	Opioids rarely needed
Severe pain after surgery	Opioids	Combinations of opioids may be prescribed if pain is severe
Muscle ache	Paracetamol, NSAIDs	If inflammation is involved, NSAIDs may work better
Toothache or pain from dental procedures	Paracetamol, NSAIDs	This should be short term use; opioids may be necessary for severe pain
Kidney stone pain	Paracetamol, NSAIDs, opioids	Opioids usually needed if pain is severe.
Pain due to heartburn or gastroesophageal reflux disease	Antacid, H_{2} antagonist, proton-pump inhibitor	Heartburn lasting more than a week requires medical attention; aspirin and NSAIDs should be avoided
Chronic back pain	Paracetamol, NSAIDs	Opioids may be necessary if other drugs do not control pain and pain is persistent
Osteoarthritis pain	Paracetamol, NSAIDs	Medical attention is recommended if pain persists
Fibromyalgia	Antidepressant, anticonvulsant	Evidence suggests that opioids are not effective in treating fibromyalgia

=== Mild pain ===
Paracetamol (acetaminophen) or a nonsteroidal anti-inflammatory drug (NSAID) such as ibuprofen will relieve mild pain.

=== Mild to moderate pain ===
Paracetamol, an NSAID, or paracetamol in a combination product with a weak opioid such as tramadol, may provide greater relief than their separate use. A combination of an opioid with acetaminophen can be frequently used, such as Percocet, Vicodin, or Norco.

=== Moderate to severe pain ===
When treating moderate to severe pain, the type of pain, acute or chronic, needs to be considered. The type of pain can result in different medications being prescribed. Certain medications may work better for acute pain, others for chronic pain, and some may work equally well on both. Acute pain medication is for the rapid onset of pain, such as from an inflicted physical trauma or to treat postoperative pain. Chronic pain medication is for alleviating long-lasting, ongoing pain.

Morphine is the gold standard to which all narcotics are compared. Semi-synthetic derivatives of morphine such as hydromorphone (i.e., Dilaudid), oxymorphone (e.g., Numorphan and Opana), nicomorphine (i.e., Vilan), hydromorphinol, and others vary in duration of action, side-effect profiles, and milligram potency. Fentanyl has the benefit of low accompanying histamine release, and thus, fewer side effects; it can also be administered via transdermal patch, which is convenient for chronic pain management. Oxycodone is used across the Americas and Europe for the relief of serious chronic pain. Its main slow-release formula is known as OxyContin. Short-acting tablets, capsules, syrups, and ampoules containing oxycodone are available, making it suitable for acute, intractable pain or breakthrough pain. Clinical studies have shown that transdermal buprenorphine is effective at reducing chronic pain. Pentazocine, dextromoramide, and dipipanone are not recommended in new patients except for acute pain where other analgesics are not tolerated or are inappropriate, for pharmacological and misuse-related reasons. In some countries, potent synthetics, such as piritramide and ketobemidone, are used for severe pain. For moderate pain, tramadol, codeine, dihydrocodeine, and hydrocodone are used, with nicocodeine, ethylmorphine and propoxyphene or dextropropoxyphene (less commonly).

Drugs of other types can be used to help opioids combat certain types of pain. Amitriptyline is prescribed for chronic muscular pain in the arms, legs, neck, and lower back with an opiate, or sometimes without it or with an NSAID. While opiates are often used in the management of chronic pain, high doses are associated with an increased risk of opioid overdose.

In the U.S., the illegal use of opioids has led to an increasingly high threshold of prescribing analgesics to patients, and as a result, minor painkillers have been prescribed. Some medical analysts have criticized that development as it might cause premature deaths among cancer patients.

=== Opioids ===
In 2009, the Food and Drug Administration (FDA) stated: "According to the National Institutes of Health, studies have shown that properly managed medical use of opioid analgesic compounds (taken exactly as prescribed) is safe, can manage pain effectively, and rarely causes addiction." In 2013, the FDA stated that "abuse and misuse of these products have created a serious and growing public health problem". Opioid medications can provide short, intermediate, or long-acting analgesia depending upon the specific properties of the medication and whether it is formulated as an extended-release drug. Opioid medications may be administered as a tablet or other capsule; by injection or intravenously; via the nasal mucosa or the oral mucosa; rectally; transdermally; epidurally; and intrathecally. In chronic pain conditions that are opioid-responsive, a combination of a long-acting (e.g., OxyContin, MS Contin, Opana ER, Exalgo, and methadone) or extended-release medication is often prescribed along with a shorter-acting medication (e.g., oxycodone, morphine, or hydromorphone) for breakthrough pain or exacerbations. Most opioid treatment used by patients outside of healthcare settings is oral (i.e., tablet, capsule or liquid), but suppositories and skin patches can be prescribed. An opioid injection is rarely needed for patients with chronic pain.

Although opioids are potent pain relievers, they do not provide complete pain relief, whether the pain is acute or chronic. Opioids are effective for managing chronic malignant pain and are somewhat effective for nonmalignant pain, such as neuropathic pain. However, there are associated adverse effects with opioid use, especially during the commencement of therapy or changes in dosage. When opioids are used for prolonged periods, drug tolerance will occur. Other risks can include chemical dependency, diversion, and addiction.

Clinical guidelines for prescribing opioids for chronic pain have been issued by the American Pain Society and the American Academy of Pain Medicine. Included in these guidelines is the importance of assessing the patient for the risk of substance abuse, misuse, or addiction. Factors correlated with an elevated risk of opioid misuse include a history of substance use disorder, younger age, major depression, and the use of psychotropic medications. Physicians who prescribe opioids should integrate pharmacotherapy with psychotherapeutic intervention. The guidelines also recommend monitoring not only pain but also functioning and the achievement of therapeutic goals. The prescribing physician should be suspicious of abuse when a patient reports a reduction in pain but has no accompanying improvement in function or progress in achieving identified goals.

The list below consists of commonly used opioid analgesics that have long-acting formulations. Common brand names for the extended-release formulation are in parentheses:

- Oxycodone (OxyContin)
- Hydromorphone (Exalgo, Hydromorph Contin)
- Morphine (M-Eslon, MS Contin)
- Oxymorphone (Opana ER)
- Fentanyl, transdermal (Duragesic)
- Buprenorphine, (Note: Methadone and buprenorphine are each used both for the treatment of opioid addiction and as analgesics) transdermal (Butrans)
- Tramadol (Ultram ER)
- Tapentadol (Nucynta ER)
- Methadone (Metadol, Methadose)
- Hydrocodone bitartrate (Hysingla ER) and bicarbonate (Zohydro ER)

=== Nonsteroidal anti-inflammatory drugs ===
The other major group of analgesics is nonsteroidal anti-inflammatory drugs (NSAIDs). They work by inhibiting the release of prostaglandins, which cause inflammatory pain (i.e., nociceptive pain). Paracetamol is not always included in this class of medications; however, paracetamol may be administered as a single medication or in combination with other analgesics (both NSAIDs and opioids). The alternatively prescribed NSAIDs such as ketoprofen and piroxicam have limited benefit in chronic pain disorders and, with long-term use, are associated with significant adverse effects. The use of selective NSAIDs designated as selective COX-2 inhibitors has significant cardio- and cerebrovascular risks, which have limited their utilization. Common NSAIDs include aspirin, ibuprofen, and naproxen. There are many NSAIDs, such as parecoxib, a selective COX-2 inhibitor, with proven effectiveness after some types of surgical procedures. Broader use of non-opioid analgesics can reduce opioid-induced side-effects.

=== Antidepressants and antiepileptic drugs ===
Some antidepressant (e.g., duloxetine) and anticonvulsant (e.g., gabapentin) drugs are used in chronic pain management and act primarily within the pain pathways of the central nervous system; peripheral mechanisms have been implicated in, for example, painful peripheral neuropathy. They are generally used to treat nerve pain resulting from nervous system injury, such as spinal cord injury; nerve injury sustained during varicella zoster virus infection (i.e., postherpetic neuralgia); or nerve injury precipitating complex regional pain syndrome type II. Diabetic neuropathy can stem from the chronically elevated blood sugar levels of type 2 diabetes. The disease mechanisms of many neuropathic pain conditions vary, and antidepressants and anticonvulsants do not work uniformly across them.

=== Cannabinoids ===
The evidence for using cannabis for pain control varies in quality, but overall there is no good evidence cannabis is effective for any type of pain management, or that it is viable as a means of reducing opioid use.

=== Ketamine ===
Low-dose ketamine is sometimes used as an alternative to opioids for the treatment of acute pain in hospital emergency departments. Ketamine probably reduces pain more than opioids and with less nausea and vomiting.

=== Other analgesics ===
Other drugs which can potentiate conventional analgesics or have analgesic properties in certain circumstances are called analgesic adjuvant medications. Gabapentin, an anticonvulsant, can reduce neuropathic pain itself and can also potentiate opiates. Drugs with anticholinergic activity, such as orphenadrine and cyclobenzaprine, are given in conjunction with opioids for neuropathic pain. Orphenadrine and cyclobenzaprine are also muscle relaxants, and are useful in painful musculoskeletal conditions. Clonidine, an alpha-2 receptor agonist, is another drug that has found use as an analgesic adjuvant. In 2021, researchers described a novel type of pain therapy — a CRISPR-dCas9 epigenome editing method for repressing Na_{v}1.7 gene expression which showed therapeutic potential in three mouse models of chronic pain.

Nefopam may be used when common alternatives are contraindicated or ineffective, or as an add-on therapy. However, it is associated with adverse drug reactions.

== Self-management ==
As of 2024, the patient is encouraged to play a major role in the management of their pain.

Self-management of chronic pain has been described as the individual's ability to manage various aspects of their chronic pain. Self-management can include building self-efficacy, monitoring one's own symptoms, goal setting and action planning. It also includes patient-physician shared decision-making, among others.

The benefits of self-management vary depending on self-management techniques used. They only have marginal benefits in management of chronic musculoskeletal pain. Some research has shown that self-management of pain can use different approaches. Those approaches can range from different therapies such as yoga, acupuncture, exercise, and other relaxation techniques. Patients could also take a more natural approach by taking different minerals, vitamins or herbs. However, research has shown there is a difference between rural patients and non-rural patients having more access to different self-management approaches. Physicians in these areas may be readily prescribing more pain medication in these rural cities due to being less experienced with pain management. Simply put, it is sometimes easier for rural patients to get a prescription that insurance pays for instead of natural approaches that cost more money than they can afford to spend on their pain management. Self-management may be a more expensive alternative.

== Future directions ==
A 2023 review said that future chronic pain diagnosis and treatment would be more personalized and precision based.

== Society and culture ==
The medical treatment of pain as practiced in Greece and Turkey is called algology (from the Greek άλγος, algos, "pain"). The Hellenic Society of Algology and the Turkish Algology-Pain Society are the relevant local bodies affiliated to the International Association for the Study of Pain.

=== Undertreatment ===
Undertreatment of pain is the absence of pain management therapy for a person in pain when treatment is indicated.

Consensus in evidence-based medicine, and the recommendations of medical specialty organizations establish guidelines to determine the treatment for pain which health care providers ought to offer. For various social reasons, persons in pain may not seek or may not be able to access treatment for their pain. Health care providers may not provide the treatment which authorities recommend.

Some studies about gender biases have concluded that pain recipients who are female are often overlooked when it comes to the perception of their pain. Whether they appeared to be in high levels of pain did not make a difference for their observers. The participants in the studies were still perceived to be in less pain than they actually were. Participants who were male, on the other hand, were offered pain relief while their self reporting indicated that their pain levels didn't necessarily warrant treatment. Prescribers have been seen over- and under-prescribing treatment to individuals based on their sex. There are other prevalent reasons that undertreatment of pain occurs. Gender is a factor, as well as race.

When it comes to prescribers treating patients, racial disparities has become a real factor. Research has shown that non-white individuals' pain perception has affected their pain treatment. The African-American community has been shown to suffer significantly when it comes to trusting the medical community to treat them. Oftentimes, medication, although available to be prescribed, is dispensed in less quantities due to their pain being perceived on a smaller scale.

=== In children ===
Acute pain is common in children and adolescents as a result of injury, illness, or necessary medical procedures. Chronic pain is present in approximately 15–25% of children and adolescents. It may be caused by an underlying disease, such as sickle cell anemia, cystic fibrosis, or rheumatoid arthritis. Cancer or functional disorders such as migraines, fibromyalgia, and complex regional pain could also cause chronic pain in children.

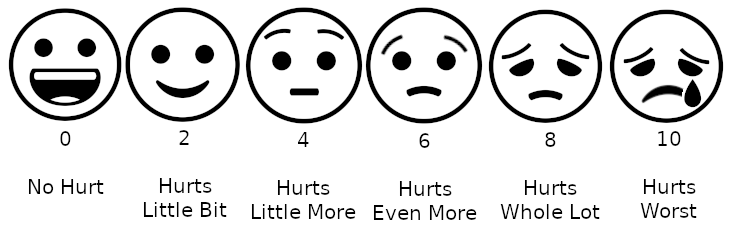
Young children can indicate their level of pain by pointing to the appropriate face on a children's pain scale.

Pain assessment in children is often challenging due to limitations in developmental level, cognitive ability, or their previous pain experiences. Clinicians must observe physiological and behavioral cues exhibited by the child to make an assessment. Self-reporting, if possible, is the most accurate measure of pain. Self-reporting pain scales involve younger kids matching their pain intensity to photographs of other children's faces, such as the Oucher Scale, pointing to schematics of faces showing different pain levels, or pointing out the location of pain on a body outline. Questionnaires for older children and adolescents include the Varni-Thompson Pediatric Pain Questionnaire and the Children's Comprehensive Pain Questionnaire. They are often utilized for individuals with chronic or persistent pain.

Paracetamol, nonsteroidal anti-inflammatory agents, and opioid analgesics are commonly used to treat acute or chronic pain symptoms in children and adolescents.

Caregivers may provide non-pharmacological treatment for children and adolescents, because it carries minimal risk and is cost effective, compared to pharmacological treatment. Non-pharmacologic interventions vary by age and developmental factors. Physical interventions to ease pain in infants include swaddling, rocking, or sucrose via a pacifier. For children and adolescents, physical interventions include hot or cold application, massage, or acupuncture. Cognitive behavioral therapy (CBT) aims to reduce the emotional distress and improve the daily functioning of school-aged children and adolescents with pain by changing the relationship between their thoughts and emotions. In addition, this therapy teaches children and adolescents adaptive coping strategies. Integrated interventions in CBT include relaxation techniques, mindfulness, biofeedback, and acceptance (in the case of chronic pain). Many therapists will hold sessions for caregivers to provide them with effective management strategies.

In red-haired individuals

In recent studies, it has been noted that people who have red hair through the MC1R receptor gene may react to opioids and perceive pain differently than the rest of the population. The studies on this developing topic have only become notable in the past few years with researchers looking into how red-haired individuals may experience a different threshold in pain, and react to pain management differently than others. Most studies find that redheads with this gene have a higher pain tolerance, and can also react more sensitively to opiates, but require more anesthesia.

=== Professional certification ===
Pain management practitioners come from all fields of medicine. In addition to medical practitioners, a pain management team may often benefit from the input of pharmacists, physiotherapists, clinical psychologists and occupational therapists, among others. Together, they can help create a package of care suitable to the patient.

==== Pain medicine in the United States ====
Pain physicians are often fellowship-trained board-certified anesthesiologists, neurologists, physiatrists, emergency physicians, or psychiatrists. Palliative care doctors are also specialists in pain management. The American Society of Interventional Pain Physicians, the American Board of Anesthesiology, the American Osteopathic Board of Anesthesiology (recognized by the AOABOS), the American Board of Physical Medicine and Rehabilitation, the American Board of Emergency Medicine and the American Board of Psychiatry and Neurology each provide certification for a subspecialty in pain management following fellowship training. The fellowship training is recognized by the American Board of Medical Specialties or the American Osteopathic Association Bureau of Osteopathic Specialists. As the field of pain medicine has grown rapidly, many practitioners have entered the field, some non-ACGME board-certified.

== See also ==
- Equianalgesic – Comparison of equivalent doses of pain medications
- List of investigational analgesics
- Opioid comparison – Comparison of equivalent doses of pain medications; an example of an equianalgesic chart
- Pain Catastrophizing Scale – Measurement tool for catastrophizing
- Pain management during childbirth
- Pain psychology
