= Adjuvant =

In pharmacology, an adjuvant is a drug or other substance, or a combination of substances, that is used to increase the efficacy or potency of certain drugs. Specifically, the term can refer to:

- Adjuvant therapy in cancer management
- Analgesic adjuvant in pain management
- Immunologic adjuvant in vaccines

Pesticide adjuvants are chemicals applied alongside pesticides to enhance the effectiveness of the active ingredient.
