= Pain Catastrophizing Scale =

Measurement tool for catastrophizing

- Purpose: Assess individual differences in responses to pain.

Catastrophic thinking has widely been recognized in the development and maintenance of hypochondriasis and anxiety disorders. This broadly accepted understanding has classified catastrophizing as a tendency to misinterpret and exaggerate situations that may be threatening. Pain is an undesirable sensory and emotional experience in response to potential or actual tissue damage. A general consensus of pain catastrophizing involves an exaggerated negative perception to painful stimuli. The components of catastrophizing that are considered primary were long under debate until the development of the Pain Catastrophizing Scale (PCS) by Michael J. L. Sullivan and Scott R. Bishop of Dalhousie University in 1995. The PCS is a 13 item scale, with each item rated on a 5-point scale: 0 (Not at all) to 4 (all the time). The PCS is broken into three subscales being magnification, rumination, and helplessness. The scale was developed as a self-report measurement tool that provided a valid index of catastrophizing in clinical and non-clinical populations. The results of the initial development and validation studies, performed by Sullivan and Bishop, indicated that the PCS is a reliable and valid measurement tool for catastrophizing, according to Sullivan and Bishop. The high test-retest relationships concluded that individuals may possess enduring beliefs with regard to the threat value of painful stimuli. It was also found that from a clinical perspective, the PCS may be useful in identifying individuals that may be more susceptible to high distress responses from aversive medical procedures such as chemotherapy or surgery.

== Further psychometric evaluation ==
A secondary study was conducted by Augustine Osman of the University of Northern Iowa to replicate the findings found in the development and validation studies of Sullivan and Bishop. At the time of the study there was a great deal of interest in understanding the cognitive factors involving pain and an individual's response to persistent pain experiences. Before the development of the Pain Catastrophizing Scale (PCS) there had been no other self-report measurement tool that focused primarily on catastrophizing. Other self-report measurement tools such as: the Coping Strategies Questionnaire (CSQ), the Pain-Related Self-Statements Scale (PRSS) and the Cognitive Coping Strategy Inventory (CCS) had subscales for assessing catastrophizing but failed to explore specific dimensions of catastrophizing. Osman conducted a series of experiments to replicate the findings of Sullivan and Bishop, as well as evaluated the validity of the PCS's ability to effectively differentiate between adult outpatient and nonclinical community samples using adult subjects. The study that Osman conducted effectively replicated the findings of Sullivan and Bishop. The Study confirmed the ability of the PCS to isolate general catastrophizing characterized by the three primary related factors (rumination, magnification, and helplessness). The PCS was found to effectively differentiate between clinical and nonclinical samples, through verifying a clear distinction between overall and subscale scores of the PCS of the tested subjects. The findings of the study provided empirical support for the PCS in future studies.

As the Pain Catastrophizing Scale has been developed, the goal of studies has shifted to its usability as a universal scale. Through various studies the PCS was shown to be invariant (with most accuracy in the three oblique factor structure) across genders and both clinical and non-clinical groups. The gender focused study expressed that female subjects report more frequent experiences of pain, varied intensity with increased persistence, and lower pain tolerances and thresholds. With minimal modification (to address the subject of the catastrophizing) the PCS can also be applied to pain catastrophizing in a social context. The social aspects studied were parents of disabled children and spouses of individuals with chronic pain. Specifically it has been shown to determine illness related stress and depression issues that arise from parent's catastrophizing about their child's pain in regards to a disability or illness. Similarly with respect to pain catastrophizing between romantic partners, spouse catastrophizing about a partner's chronic pain was related to depressive and pain severity levels in both spouses.

== Applications ==
Research of pain catastrophizing has found that catastrophic thinking can result in a more intense experience of pain. By this association, catastrophizing has led to over predictions of pain, increased use of health care and longer hospital stays. The use of the PCS in clinical and nonclinical settings can provide a more specific tool for healthcare professionals to better care for their patients. A greater understanding of a person's experience of pain can allow for a better care regimen to be implemented helping reduce problems that have previously come from catastrophizing.
