= Adjuvant therapy =

Medical treatment in addition to a primary treatment to maximise effectiveness

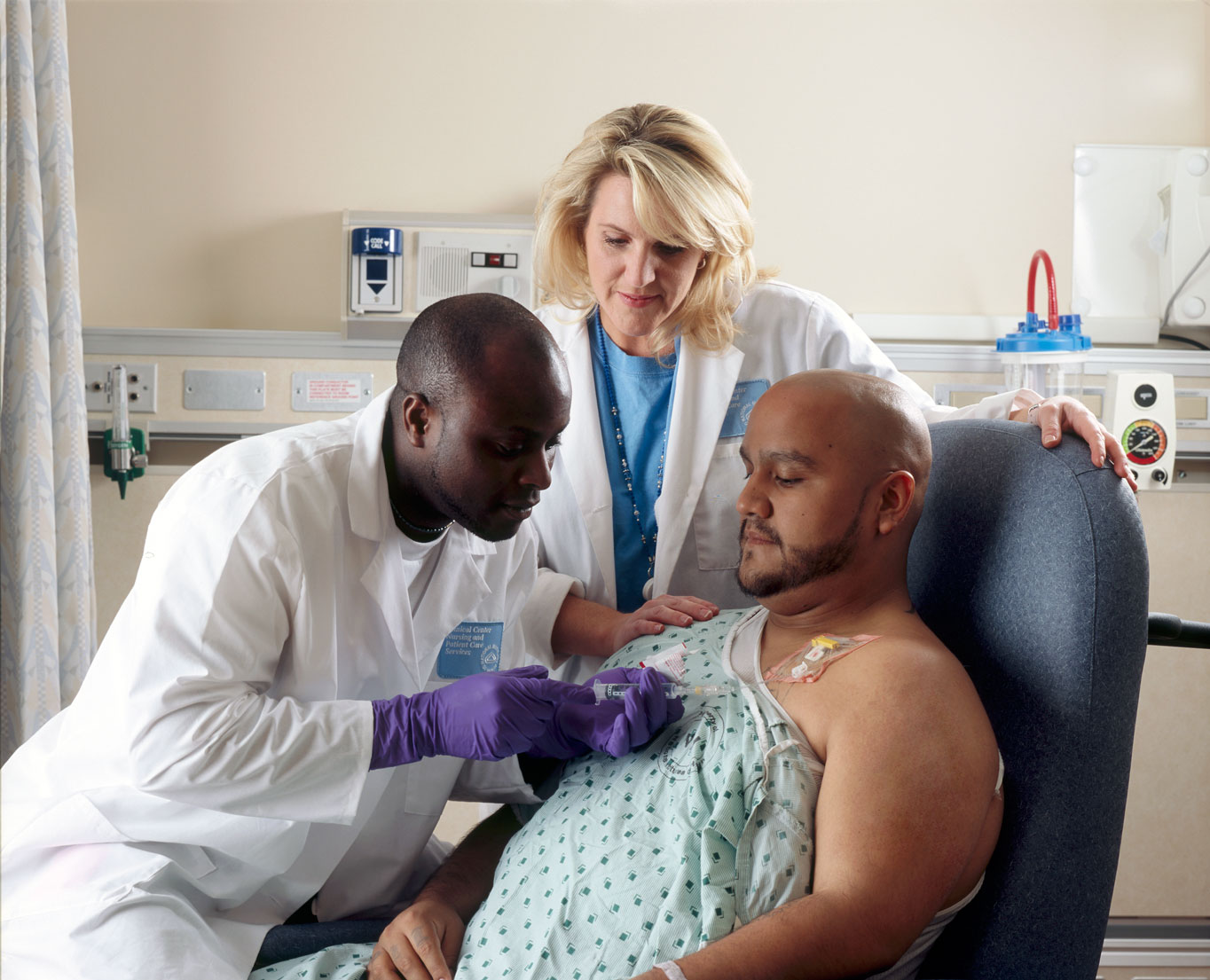
A patient receiving chemotherapy

Adjuvant therapy, also known as adjunct therapy, adjuvant care, or augmentation therapy, is a therapy that is given in addition to the primary or initial therapy to maximize its effectiveness. The surgeries and complex treatment regimens used in cancer therapy have led the term to be used mainly to describe adjuvant cancer treatments. An example of such adjuvant therapy is the additional treatment usually given after surgery where all detectable disease has been removed, but where there remains a statistical risk of relapse due to the presence of undetected disease. If known disease is left behind following surgery, then further treatment is not technically adjuvant.

An adjuvant used on its own specifically refers to an agent that improves the effect of a vaccine. Medications used to help primary medications are known as add-ons.

== History ==
The term "adjuvant therapy," derived from the Latin term adjuvāre, meaning "to help," was first coined by Paul Carbone and his team at the National Cancer Institute in 1963. In 1968, the National Surgical Adjuvant Breast and Bowel Project (NSABP) published its B-01 trial results for the first randomized trial that evaluated the effect of an adjuvant alkylating agent in breast cancer. The results indicated that the adjuvant therapy given after the initial radical mastectomy "significantly decreased recurrence rate in pre-menopausal women with four or more positive axillary lymph nodes."

The budding theory of using additional therapies to supplement primary surgery was put into practice by Gianni Bonadonna and his colleagues from the Instituto Tumori in Italy in 1973, where they conducted a randomized trial that demonstrated more favorable survival outcomes that accompanied use of cyclophosphamide methotrexate fluorouracil (CMF) after the initial mastectomy.

In 1976, shortly after Bonadonna's landmark trial, Bernard Fisher at the University of Pittsburgh initiated a similar randomized trial that compared the survival of breast cancer patients treated with radiation after the initial mastectomy to those who only received the surgery. His results, published in 1985, indicated increased disease-free survival for the former group.

Despite the initial pushback from the breast cancer surgeons who believed that their radical mastectomies were sufficient in removing all traces of cancer, the success of Bonadonna's and Fisher's trials brought adjuvant therapy to the mainstream in oncology. Since then, the field of adjuvant therapy has expanded to include a range of adjuvant therapies to include chemotherapy, immunotherapy, hormone therapy, and radiation.

== Neoadjuvant therapy ==
Neoadjuvant therapy, in contrast to adjuvant therapy, is given before the main treatment. For example, systemic therapy for breast cancer that is given before removal of a breast is considered neoadjuvant chemotherapy. The most common reason for neoadjuvant therapy for cancer is to reduce the size of the tumor so as to facilitate more effective surgery.

In the context of breast cancer, neoadjuvant chemotherapy administered before surgery can improve survival in patients. If no active cancer cells are present in a tissue extracted from the tumor site after neoadjuvant therapy, physicians classify a case as "pathologic complete response" or "pCR." While response to therapy has been demonstrated to be a strong predictor of outcome, the medical community has still not reached a consensus in regard to the definition of pCR across various breast cancer subtypes. It remains unclear whether pCR can be used as a surrogate end point in breast cancer cases.

== Adjuvant cancer therapy ==
For example, radiotherapy or systemic therapy is commonly given as adjuvant treatment after surgery for breast cancer. Systemic therapy consists of chemotherapy, immunotherapy or biological response modifiers or hormone therapy. Oncologists use statistical evidence to assess the risk of disease relapse before deciding on the specific adjuvant therapy. The aim of adjuvant treatment is to improve disease-specific symptoms and overall survival. Because the treatment is essentially for a risk, rather than for provable disease, it is accepted that a proportion of patients who receive adjuvant therapy will already have been cured by their primary surgery.

Adjuvant systemic therapy and radiotherapy are often given following surgery for multiple types of cancer, including colon cancer, lung cancer, pancreatic cancer, breast cancer, prostate cancer, glioblastoma (most common brain cancer) and some gynaecological cancers. Some forms of cancer fail to benefit from adjuvant therapy, like spindle cell carcinoma.

Hyperthermia therapy or heat therapy is also a kind of adjuvant therapy that is sometimes given in combination with radiotherapy or chemotherapy to boost the effects of these conventional treatments in treating advanced cancers. Heating the tumour area sensitises it making it more responsive to the other therapies used. It is cost-effective and safe, and is seen to have a promising role in cancer treatment.

=== Controversy ===
A motif found throughout the history of cancer therapy is the tendency for overtreatment. From the time of its inception, the use of adjuvant therapy has received scrutiny for its adverse effects on the quality of life of cancer patients. For example, because side effects of adjuvant chemotherapy can range from nausea to loss of fertility, physicians regularly practice caution when prescribing chemotherapy.

In the context of melanoma, certain treatments, such as Ipilimumab, result in high grade adverse events, or immune-related adverse events, in 10-15% of patients that parallel the effects of metastatic melanoma itself. Similarly, several common adjuvant therapies are noted for having the potential of causing cardiovascular disease. In such cases, physicians must weigh the cost of recurrence against more immediate consequences and consider factors, like age and relative cardiovascular health of a patient, before prescribing certain types of adjuvant therapy.

One of the most notable side effects of adjuvant therapy is the loss of fertility. For pre-pubescent males, testicular tissue cryopreservation is an option for preserving future fertility. For post-pubescent males, this side effect can be assuaged through semen cryopreservation. For pre-menopausal females, options to preserve fertility are oftentimes much more complex. For example, breast cancer patients of fertile age oftentimes have to weigh the risks and benefits associated with starting an adjuvant therapy regimen after primary treatment. In the some low-risk, low-benefit situations, forgoing adjuvant treatment altogether can be a reasonable decision, but in cases where the risk of metastasis is high, patients may be forced to make a difficult decision. Though options for fertility preservation exist (e.g., embryo preservation, oocyte cryopreservation, ovarian suppression, etc.), they are more often than not time-consuming and costly.

As a result of complications that can stem from liberal use of adjuvant therapy, the philosophy surrounding the use of adjuvant therapy in the clinical setting has shifted towards the goal of doing as little harm as possible to patients. The standards for dose intensity of adjuvant treatments and treatment duration are regularly updated to optimize regimen efficiency while minimizing toxic side effects that patients must shoulder.

=== Concomitant or concurrent systemic cancer therapy ===
Concomitant or concurrent systemic cancer therapy refers to administering medical treatments at the same time as other therapies, such as radiation. Adjuvant hormonal therapy is given after prostate removal in prostate cancer, but there are concerns that the side effects, in particular the cardiovascular ones, may outweigh the risk of recurrence. In breast cancer, adjuvant therapy may consist of chemotherapy (doxorubicin, trastuzumab, paclitaxel, docetaxel, cyclophosphamide, fluorouracil, and methotrexate) and radiotherapy, especially after lumpectomy, and hormonal therapy (tamoxifen, letrozole). Adjuvant therapy in breast cancer is used in stage one and two breast cancer following lumpectomy, and in stage three breast cancer due to lymph node involvement.

In glioblastoma multiforme, adjuvant chemoradiotherapy is critical, even in the case of a completely removed tumor, as recurrence often occurs within 6–9 months.

In early stage one small cell lung carcinoma, adjuvant chemotherapy with gemcitabine, cisplatin, paclitaxel, docetaxel, and other chemotherapeutic agents, and adjuvant radiotherapy is administered to either the lung, to prevent a local recurrence, or the brain to prevent metastases.

In testicular cancer, adjuvant either radiotherapy or chemotherapy may be used following orchidectomy. Previously, mainly radiotherapy was used, as a full course of cytotoxic chemotherapy produced far more side effects then a course of external beam radiotherapy (EBRT). However, it has been found a single dose of carboplatin is as effective as EBRT in stage II testicular cancer, with only mild side effects (transient myelosuppressive action vs severe and prolonged myelosuppressive neutropenic illness in normal chemotherapy, and much less vomiting, diarrhea, mucositis, and no alopecia in 90% of cases.

Adjuvant therapy is particularly effective in certain types of cancer, including colorectal carcinoma, lung cancer, and medulloblastoma. In completely resected medulloblastoma, 5-year survival rate is 85% if adjuvant chemotherapy and/or craniospinal irradiation is performed, and just 10% if no adjuvant chemotherapy or craniospinal irradiation is used. Prophylactic cranial irradiation for acute lymphoblastic leukemia (ALL) is technically adjuvant, and most experts agree that cranial irradiation decreases risk of central nervous system (CNS) relapse in ALL and possibly acute myeloid leukemia (AML), but it can cause severe side effects, and adjuvant intrathecal methotrexate and hydrocortisone may be just as effective as cranial irradiation, without severe late effects, such as developmental disability, dementia, and increased risk for second malignancy.

=== Dose-dense chemotherapy ===
Dose-dense chemotherapy (DDC) has recently emerged as an effective method of adjuvant chemotherapy administration. DDC uses the Gompertz curve to explain tumor cell growth after initial surgery removes most of the tumor mass. Cancer cells that are left over after a surgery are typically rapidly dividing cells, leaving them the most vulnerable to chemotherapy. Standard chemotherapy regimens are usually administered every 3 weeks to allow normal cells time to recover. This practice has led scientists to the hypothesis that the recurrence of cancer after surgery and chemo may be due to the rapidly diving cells outpacing the rate of chemotherapy administration. DDC tries to circumvent this issue by giving chemotherapy every 2 weeks. To lessen the side effects of chemotherapy that can be exacerbated with more closely administered chemotherapy treatments, growth factors are typically given in conjunction with DDC to restore white blood cell counts. A recent 2018 meta-analysis of DDC clinical trials in early stage breast cancer patients indicated promising results in premenopausal women, but DDC has yet to become the standard of treatment in clinics.

=== Specific cancers ===
==== Melanoma ====
The role of adjuvant therapy in melanoma is and has been hotly debated by oncologists. In 1995 a multicenter study reported improved long-term and disease-free survival in melanoma patients using interferon alpha 2b as an adjuvant therapy. Thus, later that year the U.S. Food and Drug Administration (FDA) approved interferon alpha 2b for melanoma patients who are currently free of disease, to reduce the risk of recurrence. Since then, however, some doctors have argued that interferon treatment does not prolong survival or decrease the rate of relapse, but only causes harmful side effects. Those claims have not been validated by scientific research.

Adjuvant chemotherapy has been used in melanoma, but there is little hard evidence to use chemotherapy in the adjuvant setting. However, melanoma is not a chemotherapy-resistant malignancy. Dacarbazine, temozolomide, and cisplatin all have a reproducible 10–20% response rate in metastatic melanoma.; however, these responses are often short-lived and almost never complete. Multiple studies have shown that adjuvant radiotherapy improves local recurrence rates in high-risk melanoma patients. The studies include at least two M.D. Anderson cancer center studies. However, none of the studies showed that adjuvant radiotherapy had a statistically significant survival benefit.

A number of studies are currently underway to determine whether immunomodulatory agents which have proven effective in the metastatic setting are of benefit as adjuvant therapy for patients with resected stage 3 or 4 disease.

==== Colorectal cancer ====
Adjuvant chemotherapy is effective in preventing the outgrowth of micrometastatic disease from colorectal cancer that has been removed surgically. Studies have shown that fluorouracil is an effective adjuvant chemotherapy among patients with microsatellite stability or low-frequency microsatellite instability, but not in patients with high-frequency microsatellite instability.

==== Pancreatic cancer ====
===== Exocrine =====
Exocrine pancreatic cancer has one of the lowest 5-year survival rates out of all cancers. Because of the poor outcomes associated with surgery alone, the role of adjuvant therapy has been extensively evaluated. A series of studies has established that 6 months of chemotherapy with either gemcitabine or fluorouracil, as compared with observation, improves overall survival. Newer trials incorporating immune checkpoint inhibitors such as the inhibitors to programmed death 1 (PD-1) and the PD-1 ligand PD-L1 are under way.

==== Lung cancer ====
===== Non-small cell lung cancer (NSCLC) =====
In 2015, a comprehensive meta-analysis of 47 trials and 11,107 patients revealed that NSCLC patients benefit from adjuvant therapy in the form of chemotherapy and/or radiotherapy. The results found that patients given chemotherapy after the initial surgery lived 4% longer than those who did not receive chemotherapy. The toxicity resulting from adjuvant chemotherapy was believed to be manageable.

==== Bladder cancer ====
Neoadjuvant chemotherapy (NAC) followed by a radical cystectomy (RC) and pelvic lymph node dissection is current standard of care to treat muscle-invasive bladder cancer (MIBC). NAC was justified for use in MIBC due to a randomized control trial which showed an improved median overall survival (OS; 77 months vs. 46 months, p = 0.06) and downstaging of pathology (pT0 in 38% vs. 15%) in those who received cisplatin-based NAC followed by surgery vs. surgery alone. These findings were later substantiated by a meta-analysis of 11 clinical trials that showed a 5% and 9% absolute improvement in 5-year overall survival and disease free survival, respectively. Neoadjuvant platinum-based chemotherapy has been demonstrated to improve OS in advanced bladder cancer, but there exists some controversy in the administration. Unpredictable patient response remains the drawback of NAC therapy. While it may shrink tumors in some patients, others may not respond to the treatment at all. It has been demonstrated that a delay in surgery of greater than 12 weeks from the time of diagnosis can decrease OS. Thus, the timing for NAC becomes critical, as a course of NAC therapy could delay a RC and allow the tumor to grow and further metastasize.

Micometastases cannot be ruled out in locally advanced disease, and surgery alone is not always sufficient for complete cancer control. In certain situations, acquiring precise pathologic staging can make adjuvant chemotherapy (AC) an appealing option. Stage specific pathologic treatment and reduced time to surgery can predict prognosis and the absolute OS benefits in patients with at least cT3 disease A systematic review that studied 7,056 patients showed there was a known 9-11% absolute survival benefit at five years attributable to earlier administration of AC; there was a survival benefit seen with earlier administration, as well as a benefit that persisted when compared to controls who received no AC. One limitation of AC is that poor postoperative healing or complications can limit early administration, leading to a potential propagation of potential micrometastases, early recurrence, or reduction in cancer-specific survival. Enhanced recovery after surgery protocols have recently improved perioperative care and may make earlier time to AC administration less challenging. The recent approval of adjuvant immunotherapy for patients with adverse pathology may make earlier adjuvant administration more tolerable, and be provided to patients who received NAC prior to their RC.

==== Breast cancer ====
It has been known for at least 30 years that adjuvant chemotherapy increases the relapse-free survival rate for patients with breast cancer In 2001 after a national consensus conference, a US National Institute of Health panel concluded: "Because adjuvant polychemotherapy improves survival, it should be recommended to the majority of women with localized breast cancer regardless of lymph node, menopausal, or hormone receptor status."

Agents used include:

- Cyclophosphamide
- Methotrexate
- Fluorouracil
- Doxorubicin
- Docetaxel
- Paclitaxel
- Epirubicin

However, ethical concerns have been raised about the magnitude of benefit of this therapy since it involves further treatment of patients without knowing the possibility of relapse. Dr. Bernard Fisher, among the first to conduct a clinical trial evaluating the efficacy of adjuvant therapy on patients with breast cancer, described it as a "value judgement" in which the potential benefits must be evaluated against the toxicity and cost of treatment and other potential side effects.

Often related to fear of side effects, more recent work has indicated that women do not take adjuvant therapy as prescribed or may stop before they should. A study in 2023 exploring the extent to which an information leaflet could help women to understand the benefits and to reduce their concerns and found that quotes from other women with breast cancer contributes to more positive beliefs.

==== Combination adjuvant chemotherapy for breast cancer ====
Giving two or more chemotherapeutic agents at once may decrease the chances of recurrence of the cancer, and increase overall survival in patients with breast cancer. Commonly used combination chemotherapy regimens used include:

- Doxorubicin and cyclophosphamide
- Doxorubicin and cyclophosphamide followed by docetaxel
- Doxorubicin and cyclophosphamide followed by cyclophosphamide, methotrexate, and fluorouracil
- Cyclophosphamide, methotrexate, and fluorouracil.
- Docetaxel and cyclophosphamide.
- Docetaxel, doxorubicin, and cyclophosphamide
- Cyclophosphamide, epirubicin, and fluorouracil.

==== Ovarian Cancer ====
Roughly 15% of ovarian cancers are detected at the early stage, at which the 5-year survival rate is 92%. A Norwegian meta-analysis of 22 randomized studies involving early-stage ovarian cancer revealed the likelihood that 8 out of 10 women treated with cisplatin after the initial surgery were overtreated. Patients diagnosed at an early stage who were treated with cisplatin immediately after surgery fared worse than patients who were left untreated. An additional surgical focus for young women with early-stage cancers is on the conservation of the contralateral ovary for the preservation of fertility.

Most cases of ovarian cancers are detected at the advanced stages, when the survival is greatly reduced.

==== Cervical cancer ====
In early stage cervical cancers, research suggests that adjuvant platinum-based chemotherapy after chemo-radiation may improve survival. For advanced cervical cancers, further research is needed to determine the efficacy, toxicity and effect on the quality of life of adjuvant chemotherapy.

==== Endometrial cancer ====
Since most early-stage endometrial cancer cases are diagnosed early and are typically curable with surgery, adjuvant therapy is only given after surveillance and histological factors determine that a patient is at high risk for recurrence. Adjuvant pelvic radiation therapy has received scrutiny for its use in women under 60, as studies have indicated decreased survival and increased risk of second malignancies following treatment.

In advanced-stage endometrial cancer, adjuvant therapy is typically radiation, chemotherapy, or a combination of the two. While advanced-stage cancer makes up only about 15% of diagnoses, it accounts for 50% of deaths from endometrial cancer. Patients who undergo radiation and/or chemotherapy treatment will sometimes experience modest benefits before relapse.

==== Testicular cancer ====
===== Stage I =====
For seminoma, the three standard options are: active surveillance, adjuvant radiotherapy, or adjuvant chemotherapy.

For non-seminoma, the options include: active surveillance, adjuvant chemotherapy and retroperitoneal lymph node dissection.

As is the case for all reproductive cancers, a degree of caution is taken when deciding to use adjuvant therapy to treat early stage testicular cancer. Though the 5-year survival rates for stage I testicular cancers is approximately 99%, there still exists controversy over whether to overtreat stage I patients to prevent relapse or to wait until patients experience relapse. Patients treated with standard chemotherapy regimens can experience "second malignant neoplasms, cardiovascular disease, neurotoxicity, nephrotoxicity, pulmonary toxicity, hypogonadism, decreased fertility, and psychosocial problems." As such to minimize overtreatment and avoid potential long-term toxicity caused by adjuvant therapy, most patients today are treated with active surveillance.

=== Side effects of adjuvant cancer therapy ===
Depending on what form of treatment is used, adjuvant therapy can have side effects, like all therapy for neoplasms. Chemotherapy frequently causes vomiting, nausea, alopecia, mucositis, myelosuppression particularly neutropenia, sometimes resulting in septicaemia. Some chemotherapeutic agents can cause acute myeloid leukaemia, in particular the alkylating agents. Rarely, this risk may outweigh the risk of recurrence of the primary tumor. Depending on the agents used, side effects such as chemotherapy-induced peripheral neuropathy, leukoencephalopathy, bladder damage, constipation or diarrhea, hemorrhage, or post-chemotherapy cognitive impairment. Radiotherapy causes radiation dermatitis and fatigue, and, depending on the area being irradiated, may have other side effects. For instance, radiotherapy to the brain can cause memory loss, headache, alopecia, and radiation necrosis of the brain. If the abdomen or spine is irradiated, nausea, vomiting, diarrhea, and dysphagia can occur. If the pelvis is irradiated, prostatitis, proctitis, dysuria, metritis, diarrhea, and abdominal pain can occur. Adjuvant hormonal therapy for prostate cancer may cause cardiovascular disease, and other, possibly severe, side effects.

== See also ==
- Analgesic adjuvant
