= Pain catastrophizing =

Pain catastrophizing is the tendency to describe a pain experience in more exaggerated terms than the average person, to ruminate on it more (e.g., "I kept thinking 'this is terrible'"), and/or to feel more helpless about the experience ("I thought it was never going to get better"). People who report a large number of such thoughts during a pain experience are more likely to rate the pain as more intense than those who report fewer such thoughts.

One suggestion is that catastrophizing influences pain perception through altering attention and anticipation, and heightening emotional responses to pain. However, we cannot yet rule out the possibility that at least some aspects of catastrophization may actually be the product of an intense pain experience, rather than its cause. That is, the more intense the pain feels to the person, the more likely they are to have thoughts about it that fit the definition of catastrophization.

== Measurement ==
The components of catastrophizing that are considered primary were long under debate until the development of the pain catastrophizing scale (PCS). The pain catastrophizing scale is a 13-item self-report scale to measure pain catastrophizing created by Michael J. L. Sullivan, Scott R. Bishop and Jayne Pivik. In the PCS, each item is rated on a 5-point scale: 0 (Not at all) to 4 (all the time). It is broken into three subscales being magnification, rumination, and helplessness. The scale was developed as a self-report measurement tool that provided a valid index of catastrophizing in clinical and non-clinical populations. It is hypothesized that pain catastrophizing is related to various levels of pain, physical disability and psychological disability in clinical and nonclinical populations.

=== Pain catastrophizing scale ===
1. I worry all the time about whether the pain will end. (H)
2. I feel I can't go on. (H)
3. It's terrible and I think it's never going to get any better. (H)
4. It's awful and I feel that it overwhelms me. (H)
5. I feel I can't stand it anymore. (H)
6. I become afraid that the pain may get worse. (M)
7. I think of other painful experiences. (M)
8. I anxiously want the pain to go away. (R)
9. I can't seem to keep it out of my mind. (R)
10. I keep thinking about how much it hurts. (R)
11. I keep thinking about how badly I want the pain to stop. (R)
12. There is nothing I can do to reduce the intensity of the pain. (H)
13. I wonder whether something serious may happen. (M)

(Note: For the listed items above, (R) Rumination, (M) Magnification, and (H) Helplessness.)

Before the development of the PCS there had been no other self-report measurement tool that focused primarily on catastrophizing. Other self-report measurement tools such as: the Coping Strategies Questionnaire (CSQ), the Pain-Related Self-Statements Scale (PRSS) and the Cognitive Coping Strategy Inventory (CCS) had subscales for assessing catastrophizing but failed to explore specific dimensions of catastrophizing.

Studies of the PCS have generally used a self-report design. Participants are asked about pain experiences in their past; they then rate how well various statements fit their thoughts and feelings at the time. Several such studies have shown the PCS to be invariant, with most accuracy in the three oblique factor structure, across genders and both clinical and non-clinical groups. The gender focused study expressed that female subjects report more frequent experiences of pain, varied intensity with increased persistence, and lower pain tolerances and thresholds. However, it is important to remember that these studies ask participants to report on pain experiences from their past; the overall level of pain experienced is not controlled across genders. If female participants have, on average, experienced more intense and/or persistent pain in their past than male participants, this could also explain their higher endorsement of items relating to pain catastrophizing. Further, more controlled studies are urgently needed to tease apart these issues of cause and effect.

With minimal modification, to address the subject of the catastrophizing, the PCS can also be applied to pain catastrophizing in a social context. The social aspects studied were parents of disabled children and spouses of individuals with chronic pain. Specifically it has been shown to determine illness related stress and depression issues that arise from parent's catastrophizing about their child's pain in regards to a disability or illness. Similarly with respect to pain catastrophizing between romantic partners, spouse catastrophizing about a partner's chronic pain was related to depressive and pain severity levels in both spouses.

=== Applications ===
Research on pain catastrophizing has found that catastrophic thinking is associated with a more intense experience of pain. This may in turn lead to increased use of health care and longer hospital stays. Following this logic, if the catastrophic thinking can be addressed, then the person's pain experience may also be reduced, which in turn may reduce health care utilization. The use of scales such as the PCS may be useful for measuring pain catastrophizing in these contexts.

== Treatment ==
The primary treatment for pain catastrophizing is cognitive behavioral therapy, which was demonstrated to be effective in a 2020 Cochrane review. This is typically delivered in individual psychotherapy sessions or group pain coping skills classes. Sessions and classes typically span 6 to 12 weeks and cover a variety of psychobehavioral topics in addition to pain catastrophizing. In 2014, researchers at Stanford University found that a single-session class developed specifically to treat pain catastrophizing was effective. However, to date, apart from the references above, there have been no other studies that meet the typical standards for medical treatment intervention research (for example, where patients are randomly assigned to a treatment or control condition, and patients are unaware of which condition is expected to produce a better outcome).
