= Childhood chronic pain =

Medical condition

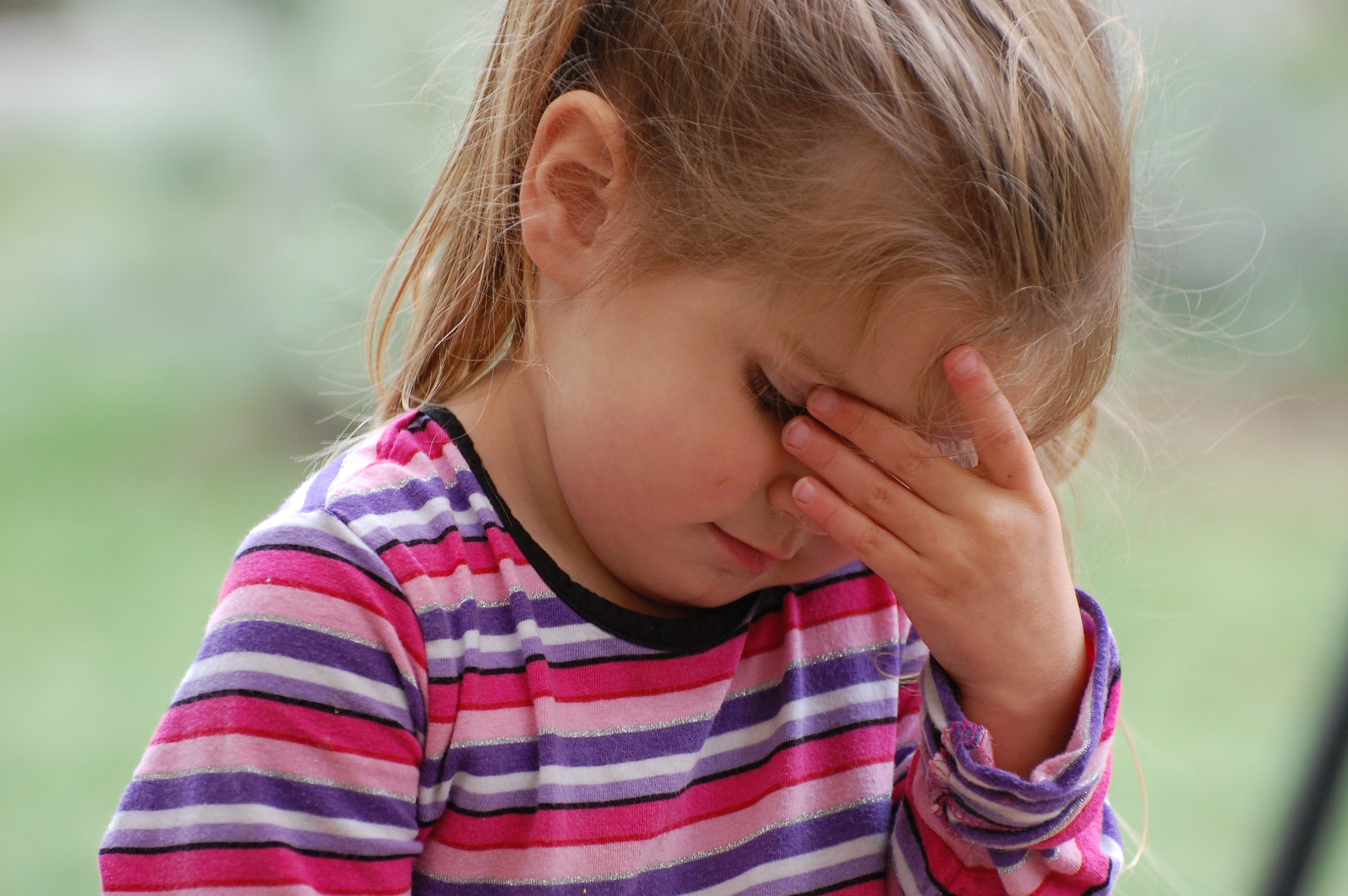
Headaches are one of the most common forms of childhood chronic pain.

Childhood chronic pain affects at least 5% of the population under the age of 18, according to conservative epidemiological studies. Rates of pediatric chronic pain have also increased in the past 20 years. While chronic pain conditions vary significantly in severity, they often affect children's mental health, academic performance, activities of daily living, social participation, and general quality of life. The outcomes of childhood chronic pain are affected by a number of factors, including demographic factors, genetics, access to rehabilitation services, and school and family support.

== Classification and epidemiology ==
Chronic pain is defined as pain that lasts at least 3–6 months and, in the case of injury or surgery, remains present after standard recovery time has elapsed. The ICD-11 provides seven categories for diagnosing chronic pain:

- Chronic primary pain
- Chronic cancer pain
- Chronic postsurgical and posttraumatic pain
- Chronic neuropathic pain
- Chronic headache and orofacial pain
- Chronic visceral pain
- Chronic musculoskeletal pain

Childhood chronic pain can be caused by a number of conditions, including the following:

Condition	Symptoms	Known causes and risk factors	Estimated prevalence	Treatments
Chronic abdominal pain	Recurrent abdominal pain, usually without a known organic cause	Usually unknown	8.4%	Drug therapies, cognitive behavioural therapy (CBT)
Chronic headache	Recurrent headache (at least 15 days per month, 4 hours per day)	Sex (more common in females), psychological disturbances, obesity, overuse of caffeine or headache medication, other chronic pain conditions	1.5% - 3.4%	Antidepressants, beta blockers, anticonvulsants, NSAIDs, botulinum toxin, CBT, occupational therapy
Complex regional pain syndrome	Severe burning/throbbing pain (usually in a limb), swelling, sensitivity, changes in skin colour and texture	Injury or trauma	Unknown	Pain relievers, corticosteroids, bone-loss medication, sympathetic nerve-blocking medication, intravenous ketamine, physical therapy, occupational therapy, psychotherapy, biofeedback, spinal cord stimulation
Juvenile fibromyalgia	Widespread muskuloskeletal pain, headache, sleep disturbances, fatigue	Genetics, sex (more common in females), infections, trauma, rheumatic disease	1.2% - 6.2%	Antidepressants, anticonvulsants, pain relievers, CBT
Juvenile rheumatoid arthritis	Joint pain, swelling, and stiffness	Genetics, sex (more common in females)	0.4%	NSAIDs, TNF blockers, immune suppressants, corticosteroids, physical therapy, occupational therapy

== Management ==
Chronic pain can be treated in a number of ways, and varies depending on the type and severity of the condition. Common pain medications prescribed to children include paracetamol, ibuprofen, and acetylsalicylic acid. Researchers have also found that psychotherapies are often helpful in reducing functional disability in children with chronic pain. A meta-analysis by Christopher Eccleston and colleagues found that cognitive behavioural therapy (CBT) significantly reduced pain severity for children with chronic headaches. Additionally, biofeedback and relaxation therapy can be used in conjunction with CBT to treat chronic pain. Research thus far has typically found small effects for improving psychological wellbeing, but more robust outcomes for pain relief.

The management of chronic pain in children aims also to help the child and their family reintegrate into a more functional routine and improve their daily struggle. The focus changes from immediate pain relief to enhancing functional improvements while managing the presence of pain. Since pediatric chronic pain can have various complex causes, current data suggest that a comprehensive multidisciplinary treatment is important and is frequently the most successful approach to achieve remission or management of symptoms. This treatment approach typically involves a combination of therapies, including occupational therapy, physical therapy, medications, pain psychology, and parental education.

These multidisciplinary treatments usually include applying both pain reduction and coping strategies. For example, occupational therapy helps clients use meaningful activities to feel better. Occupational therapists may teach sensory desensitization strategies as well as provide some adaptations and compensations to perform challenging daily activities and develop a daily schedule to support engagement in meaningful activities. Physiotherapists may improve strength and endurance, while psychologists will focus on psychoeducation, behavioral exposures, and relaxation training. Additionally, parents may receive psychoeducation to develop family strategies for managing pain behaviors and overcoming potential obstacles to facilitate a successful transition to the home environment. For instance, cognitive behavior therapy (CBT) has seen to be very highly effective in diminishing anxiety and depression as well as confidence issues of children with a chronic pain condition called Juvenile Primary Fibromyalgia Syndrome. However, CBT has not been seen to help with reducing pain intensity. One study found success with both CBT and neuromuscular exercise helped reduce anxiety as well as improve physical function.

== Outcomes ==
=== Education ===
Chronic pain often interferes with children's ability to attend and succeed in school. Children with severe disorders are particularly likely to miss school because of debilitating pain, as well as for medical appointments. High rates of school absence are associated with poor adjustment and psychosocial wellbeing among children with chronic illnesses. For children with severe chronic pain disorders, school districts may provide a variety of services, including inpatient, homebound, and special education. Support services such as occupational therapy may provide specialized tools, equipment, and modifications of the environment to improve the child’s participation in educational roles and activities.

==== Inpatient education ====
Some hospitals employ or contract tutors to assist children in inpatient care with their schoolwork. Hospital teachers are typically certified to teach a wide variety of ages and subjects. At the same time, in a study by Steinke et al., around one-third of hospital teachers reported teaching ages or subjects beyond their areas of certification. The number of hospital teachers is declining due to reduced hospitalization and shorter hospital stays.

==== Homebound education ====
In many school districts in the United States, homebound education is offered to students who miss more than 15 days in a row. Homebound education typically consists of 45 minutes of instruction per day in the child's home. Through an Individualized Education Plan (IEP) or 504 Plan students may also receive access to support services in the home including occupational therapy, physical therapy, or speech therapy when justified. Other nations, including Australia and Belgium, have implemented programs to use technology to include chronically ill students in their regular class sessions, and these programs have generally had positive results. Many critics of homebound education believe that it is not a sufficient substitute for classroom learning. Additionally, many children with chronic pain have intermittent rather than extended absences, which makes them ineligible for homebound education services. Even when homebound education is an option, it is often difficult for students from low-income or otherwise disadvantaged backgrounds. Programs typically require a computer, Internet connection, a quiet and well-lit space, and parental supervision, demands that may prove burdensome for economically disadvantaged families.

==== Special education services ====
While children with chronic pain are typically not placed in special education classrooms, they may receive health-related accommodations through a 504 Plan. Such accommodations may include shorter school days, exemption from requirements like physical education classes, arrangements to deliver medication and other treatments, and programs to educate classmates about their disorder. These measures require extensive communication between teachers, doctors, therapists, and school nurses.

=== Family impacts ===
Paediatric chronic pain often impacts quality of life for the families of children affected, with mothers having particularly low health-related quality of life on average. Parents of children with chronic pain conditions allocate considerable physical, financial, and emotional resources towards health care for their child. For example, a study by Ho and colleagues found that primary caregivers for chronically ill children spent an average of around $8800 and 28.5 hours on medical appointments in the past three months, causing them to miss an average of 4 days of work.

Participation in daily activities

Children with chronic pain often avoid engaging in daily activities due to fear of experiencing pain. These avoidance behaviors can significantly disrupt their physical, social, and emotional functioning and may even worsen their medical condition and pain levels. Multidisciplinary treatment, especially occupational therapy, is designed to address this issue and aims to increase children's engagement in activities of daily living. Occupational therapy empowers children to heal through creative activities and roles that help distract them from their pain in a purposeful, functional way. Moreover, it has been found that parents have a significant influence on their child's perception of pain.The overly protective parental style can be associated with "catastrophizing" their child's pain in a way that promotes social restriction and isolation. Multiple studies have found a correlation to highly protective parental styles to an increase in disability of children with chronic pain.

=== Mental health ===
Childhood chronic pain often exists alongside mental health conditions like anxiety disorders, depression, and post-traumatic stress disorder (PTSD), with elevated rates of these disorders lasting into adulthood. There are a variety of theories that address this relationship. Chronic pain is emotionally stressful both to the child affected and to his or her family, which may increase their risks for mental illness. Chronic pain and PTSD can also be "mutually maintaining", with cognitive, behavioural, and affective patterns creating a cycle of worsening physical and mental symptoms. Under this model, depressive symptoms (such as reduced activity and increased physiological arousal) aggravate pain symptoms, and unhealthy coping strategies (such as catastrophic thinking) worsen mental health.

Many mental health disorders also share neurobiological mechanisms with psychological disorders, such as activating the HPA axis and increasing the production of stress hormones. Chronic pain, anxiety, depression, and PTSD are also all associated dysfunction involving serotonin and brain-derived neurotrophic factor. New research has also linked both chronic pain and mental illness to inflammation.

=== Quality of life ===
In a study of patients at a paediatric pain clinic, researchers found that chronic pain had a significant negative impact on quality of life. Depression was also prevalent, and was correlated with functional disability. Additionally, psychosocial adjustment is a better predictor of school attendance than pain severity, which suggests that it is an important variable in examining outcomes of children with chronic pain. The psychological consequences of chronic pain may be exacerbated with the stigma associated with it. Many people do not typically associate chronic pain with children, and so may minimize or dismiss its impact.

Well-being

Well-being is defined by the World Health Organization (WHO) as "a general term encompassing the total universe of human life domains, including physical, mental, and social aspects". Chronic pain in children has far-reaching effects on their well-being, impacting both the children and their families. These children often suffer from additional symptoms caused by the pain such as difficulty in social participation, learning difficulties and a general decrease in quality of life.

== Factors affecting outcomes ==
=== Demographic factors ===
Chronic pain, especially chronic headache, is more common in girls, older children, and children from low socioeconomic status backgrounds. According to researchers Anna Huguet and Jordi Miró, the most common locations for paediatric chronic pain are the head and abdomen. These two locations are more likely to be sources of chronic pain for girls, whereas boys are more likely to experience lower limb pain. Girls are also more likely than boys to experience multiple sources of pain. The prevalence of chronic pain among girls increases sharply between the ages of 12 and 14, which leads some researchers to believe that it is linked to menarche and other hormonal changes during puberty.

Age also has a significant impact on children's experiences with chronic pain. Young children often cannot describe their pain in ways that adults understand, and even older children may lack the vocabulary to clearly communicate with medical professionals. Doctors, especially general practitioners, may also lack experience diagnosing or treating paediatric chronic pain disorders, and so make patients and their families feel "judged, disbelieved, and labeled as difficult or dysfunctional".

Access to creative programs and integrative services that address pain and improve self advocacy skills in the community can vary. Outpatient therapies such as occupational therapy, physical therapy, and counseling can work together to address pain. Access to social opportunities and leisure opportunities that are meaningful and not overwhelming can be helpful; these can often be provided through community organizations such as nonprofits. Mindfulness, yoga, art, music, journaling, or meditative imagery may be utilized. Communication with others who are in the same situation or have seen improvement in pain management can be helpful. Some states or insurances may provide families with funding for services or respite care.

=== Genetics and family factors ===
Chronic pain can run in families, with the risk of paediatric chronic pain increasing dramatically for offspring of adults with chronic pain. This is often attributable to genetic predispositions to certain disorders, but can also be associated with individual differences in stress response. Researchers at UCLA found that adults with the 5-HTTLPR S allele had higher cortisol levels, which can contribute both to the progression of chronic pain disorders and to less positive parenting.

For chronic pain patients, family support is an important factor in promoting successful pain management and rehabilitation. While healthy family interaction has a positive impact on paediatric pain patients, overprotectiveness and unhealthy relationship demands can foster depressive symptoms.

=== School support ===
School support is also an important factor influencing paediatric chronic pain outcomes. When children receive appropriate support from teachers and school counsellors, and support staff such as therapists they are more likely to achieve attain success and psychological wellbeing. This process can often be facilitated by a paediatric nurse practitioner (PNP), who coordinates a child's education with his or her medical treatment.

==== Peer education ====
An important component of school support for many children with chronic pain is peer education. These children often face bullying and exclusion from peers, especially when they have visible markers of disability (i.e. a wheelchair) or are unable to participate in school activities (i.e. physical education classes or recess games). Peer education programs vary based on the child's age and medical condition, but often include informative presentations, role playing, and question and answer sessions. Evaluations of the efficacy of these programs have generally shown positive effects for increasing peers' disease-related knowledge, but uncertainty remains about whether they can produce changes in attitudes and behaviours.

==== Teacher education ====
The majority of teachers feel some degree of anxiety about having children with chronic health conditions in their classrooms. Only 40% of teachers in a study by Clay and colleagues received formal training about teaching children with chronic illnesses, and so many were concerned about providing appropriate accommodations and handling any medical emergencies. Teacher education programs have found moderate positive effects in increasing school personnel's knowledge about chronic pain and comfortableness teaching children with chronic pain disorders.
