= List of chronic pain syndromes =

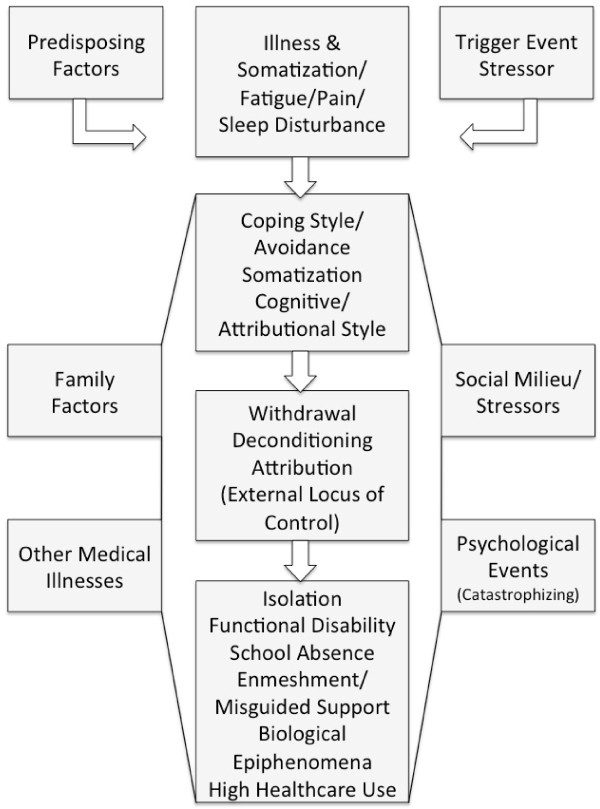
Explanatory model of chronic pain.

Chronic pain is defined as reoccurring or persistent pain lasting more than 3 months. The International Association for the Study of Pain (IASP) defines pain as "An unpleasant sensory and emotional experience associated with, or resembling that associated with, actual or potential tissue damage". Chronic pain continues past normal healing times and therefore does not have the same function as acute pain, which is to signal that there is a threat so the body can avoid future danger. Chronic pain is considered a syndrome because of the associated symptoms that develop in those experiencing this disorder. Chronic pain affects approximately 20% of people worldwide and accounts for 15–20% of visits to a physician.

Pain can be categorized according to its location, cause, or the anatomical system which it affects. Pain can also defy these classifications, making it difficult to classify chronic pain. The newest standard for classifying chronic pain was created for the ICD-11. To create this classification system the IASP collaborated with the World Health Organization to form the Task Force for the Classification of Chronic Pain. The IASP Task Force was made up of pain experts. This task force developed a new model to classify chronic pain for the ICD-11. This new classification system emphasizes the cause of pain, underlying mechanisms, body sites, and the biopsychosocial model of chronic pain. This classification system differentiates chronic primary pain from chronic secondary pain, incorporates already existing diagnosis, and further characterizes chronic pain syndromes. The ICD-11 category for chronic pain includes the most common types of chronic pain, chronic primary pain, chronic cancer pain, chronic posttraumatic and postsurgical pain, chronic neuropathic pain, chronic secondary headache and orofacial pain, chronic secondary visceral pain, and chronic secondary musculoskeletal pain. There can also be significant overlap between the categories. The ICD-11 also has an "other" subcategory for each category of pain, such as "other specified chronic cancer pain" or "other specified chronic neuropathic pain", to include chronic pain that does not fit into other categories.

== Chronic primary pain ==
Chronic primary pain affects one or more anatomical sites, reoccurs or persists for more than three months, causes emotional distress or functional disability, and cannot be better explained by another chronic pain condition. Emotional distress can be expressed in a number of ways such as frustration, anxiety, depression, demoralization, and anger. Functional disability encompasses a large range of difficulties such as working, sleeping, or social activities. Chronic primary pain can affect any body system or site and can also be widespread. Conditions within this category are further classified into chronic widespread pain, complex regional pain syndromes, chronic primary headache and orofacial pain, chronic primary visceral pain, and chronic primary musculoskeletal pain.

=== Chronic widespread pain ===
Chronic widespread pain is defined as diffuse musculoskeletal pain affecting at least four of five body regions and in at least three or more body quadrants and axial skeleton. Body quadrants are defined as the upper left, upper right, lower left, and lower right quadrants of the body. Chronic widespread pain cannot be attributed to a nociceptive process in these areas.

- Fibromyalgia
- Myofascial pain syndrome

=== Complex regional pain syndromes ===
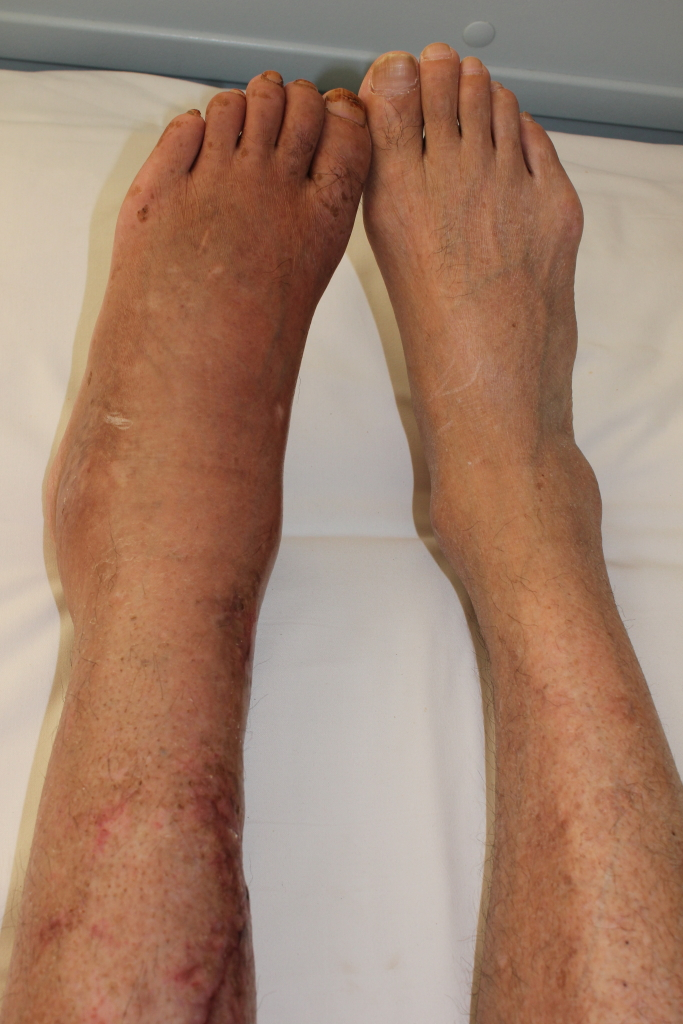
A 60-year-old male patient suffering from type I CRPS, majorly caused by left tibial fracture. Picture taken after 6 months of the injury.

Complex regional pain syndrome is characterized by pain that is distributed regionally, usually starts in an extremity distally, occurs after a trauma, and is disproportionate in severity or duration compared to the expected course of the trauma — the sites affected by complex regional pain syndrome experience autonomic and inflammatory changes. Complex regional pain syndrome is divided into two types, type 2 requires evidence of peripheral nerve injury, while type 1 does not.

- Complex regional pain syndrome type I
- Complex regional pain syndrome type II

=== Chronic primary headache and orofacial pain ===
Chronic primary headache or orofacial pain is orofacial pain or headache that persists for longer than three months and occurs at least 15 days a month. When untreated the pain lasts at least two hours or can occur as many shorter episodes of pain throughout the day.

- Chronic migraine
- Chronic tension-type headache
- Trigeminal autonomic cephalalgias
- Chronic temporomandibular disorder
- Chronic burning mouth pain
- Chronic primary orofacial pain

=== Chronic primary visceral pain ===
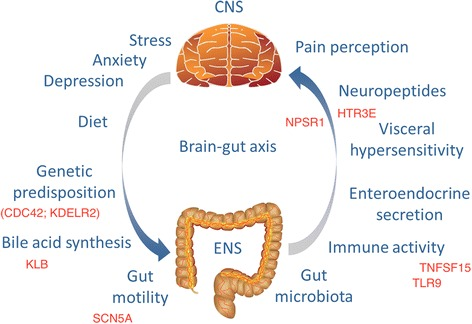
Factors proposed to be involved in the complex pathophysiology of irritable bowel syndrome.

Chronic primary visceral pain occurs in the head or neck viscera of the digestive system; the abdominal area from viscera of the digestive system, such as IBS; the thoracic region, such as non-cardiac chest pain; and the pelvic area from the involvement of viscera of the urinary, digestive, and genital systems, such as chronic pelvic pain. Visceral pain is caused by nociceptor activation in pelvic, thoracic, or abdominal organs.

- Chronic primary chest pain syndrome
- Chronic primary epigastric pain syndrome
- Irritable bowel syndrome
- Chronic primary abdominal pain syndrome
- Chronic primary bladder pain syndrome
- Chronic primary pelvic pain syndrome

=== Chronic primary musculoskeletal pain ===
Chronic primary musculoskeletal pain affects the joints, muscles, bones, or tendons. Chronic primary musculoskeletal pain syndromes are classified by the location in which they affect.

- Chronic primary low back pain
- Chronic primary cervical pain
- Chronic primary thoracic pain
- Chronic primary limb pain

== Chronic secondary pain ==
Chronic secondary pain syndromes are caused by other medical conditions. Pain may initially be a symptom of a disease, however, it can also persist after successful treatment of the underlying disorder. Chronic secondary pain can be further categorized into chronic cancer-related pain, chronic postsurgical or posttraumatic pain, chronic neuropathic pain, chronic secondary headache or orofacial pain, chronic secondary visceral pain, and chronic secondary musculoskeletal pain.

=== Chronic cancer-related pain ===
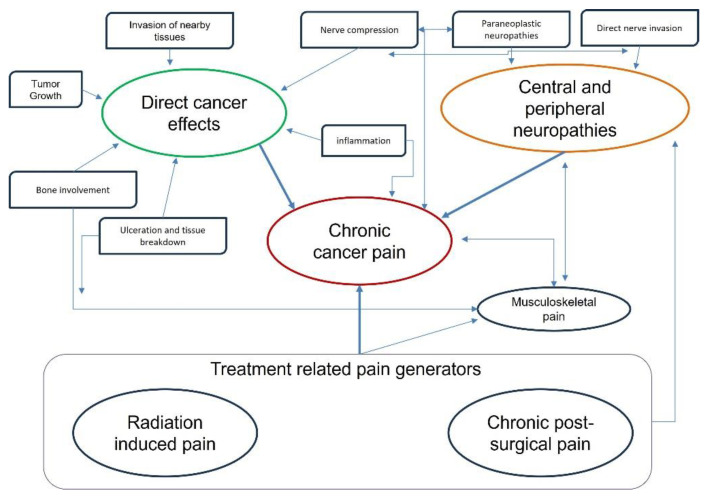
Mechanisms of cancer pain

Pain is the most common symptom of cancer at the time of diagnosis. Cancer-related pain can be caused by metastases, the tumour itself, inflamed or eroding bone viscera or nerves, or pain related to cancer treatments. The term "cancer-related pain" only indicates that pain is related to cancer and does not imply the exact cause of the pain.

==== Chronic cancer pain ====
Chronic cancer pain is caused by metastases or primary cancer. It has neuropathic and inflammatory mechanisms that are caused by how tissue responds to tumours or metastases. Neuropathic pain is caused by damage to the somatosensory nervous system. Signs and symptoms of neuropathic pain include allodynia (pain caused by non-painful stimuli), hyperalgesia (an increase in pain perception due to painful stimuli), and paresthesia (abnormal sensations such as needle bites, tingling, itching, and decreased or loss of sensitivity).

- Chronic visceral cancer pain
- Chronic bone cancer pain
- Chronic neuropathic cancer pain

==== Chronic postcancer treatment pain ====
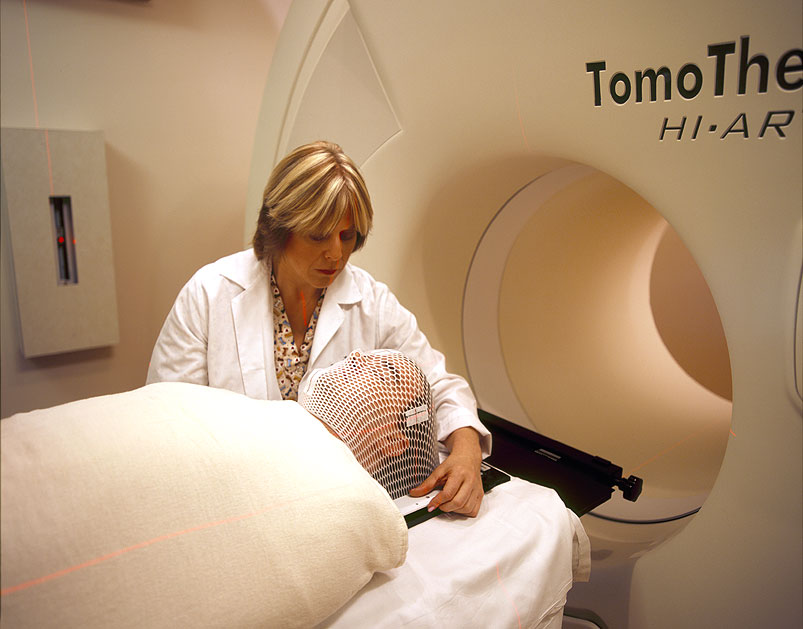
Patient preparing for radiation therapy

Cancer treatments can also contribute to chronic pain. Cancer treatments include chemotherapy, surgery, and radiotherapy, which are known to cause chronic pain.

- Chronic postcancer medicine pain
- Chronic painful chemotherapy-induced polyneuropathy
- Chronic post radiotherapy pain
- Chronic painful radiation-induced neuropathy
- Chronic postcancer surgery pain

=== Chronic postsurgical or posttraumatic pain ===
Chronic postsurgical or posttraumatic pain is pain that develops or becomes more severe following surgery or an injury. Chronic postsurgical or posttraumatic pain continues past the expected timeframe for healing (typically three months). The pain is restricted to the surgical field or injury site, projected to the innervation region of a nearby nerve, or referred to a dermatome.

==== Chronic posttraumatic pain ====
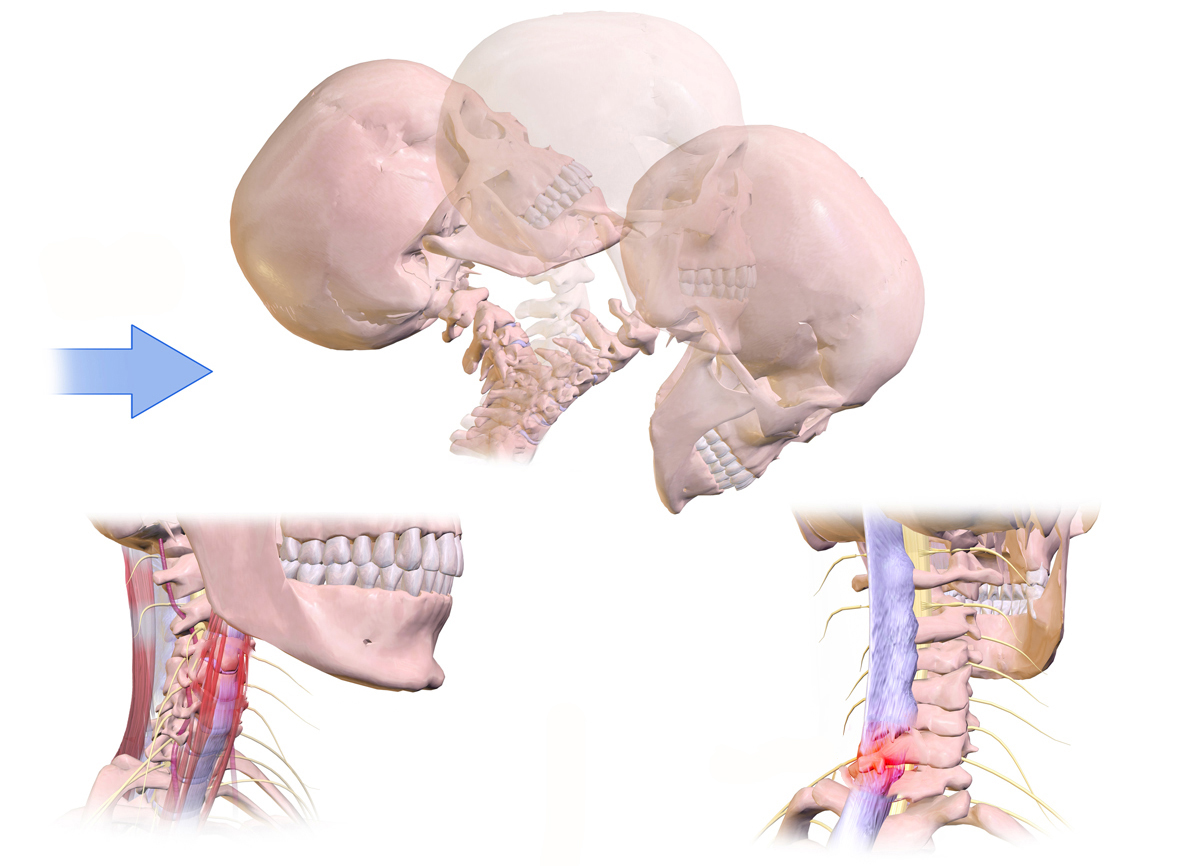
Hyperextension and hyperflexion in whiplash injury.

Chronic posttraumatic pain is pain that develops or worsens after an injury. The pain is either localized to the injured region, referred to a dermatomal region, or innervation territory of the nerves in the area.

- Chronic pain after burns injury
- Chronic whiplash injury associated pain
- Chronic pain after musculoskeletal injury
- Chronic pain after peripheral nerve injury or chronic pain after central nervous system injury

==== Chronic postsurgical pain ====
Chronic postsurgical pain refers to pain that develops or becomes more severe after a surgical procedure.

- Chronic pain after spinal surgery
- Chronic pain after herniotomy
- Chronic pain after hysterectomy
- Chronic pain after amputation
- Chronic pain after thoracotomy
- Chronic pain after breast surgery
- Chronic pain after arthroplasty

=== Chronic neuropathic pain ===
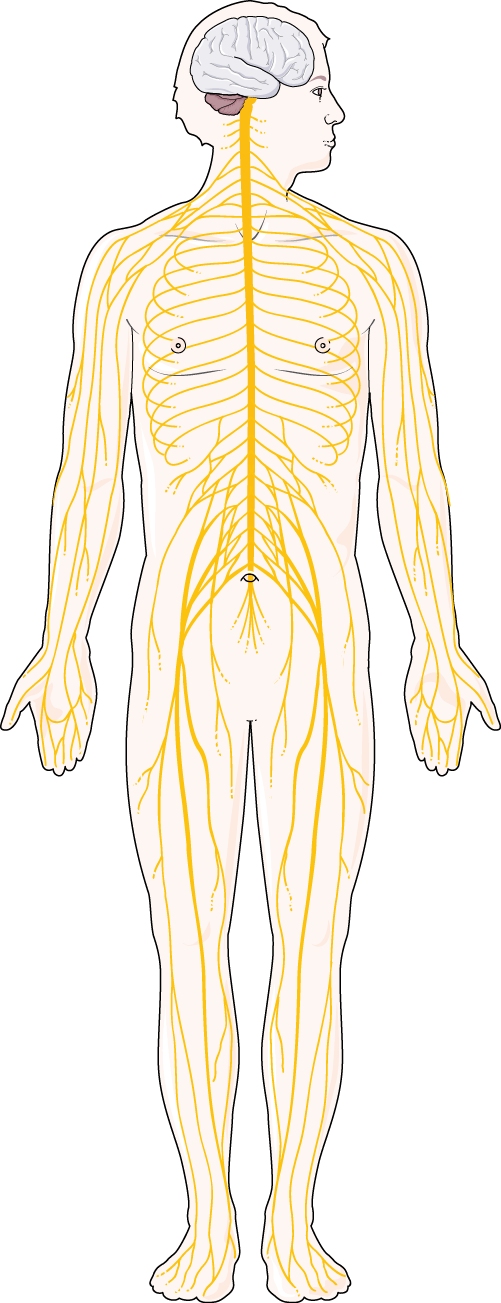
Human nervous system

Chronic neuropathic pain is caused by a disease or lesion of the somatosensory nervous system. Chronic neuropathic pain requires a history of nervous system injury or disease as well as a distribution of pain that makes sense in the context of neuroanatomy.

==== Chronic central neuropathic pain ====
Chronic central neuropathic pain is caused by a lesion or disease of the central somatosensory nervous system.

- Chronic central neuropathic pain associated with spinal cord injury
- Chronic central neuropathic pain associated with brain injury
- Chronic central post stroke pain
- Chronic central neuropathic pain associated with multiple sclerosis

==== Chronic peripheral neuropathic pain ====
Chronic peripheral neuropathic pain is caused by a lesion or disease of the peripheral somatosensory nervous system.

- Chronic neuropathic pain after peripheral nerve injury
- Chronic painful polyneuropathy
- Chronic painful radiculopathy
- Postherpetic neuralgia
- Trigeminal neuralgia

=== Chronic secondary headache or orofacial pain ===
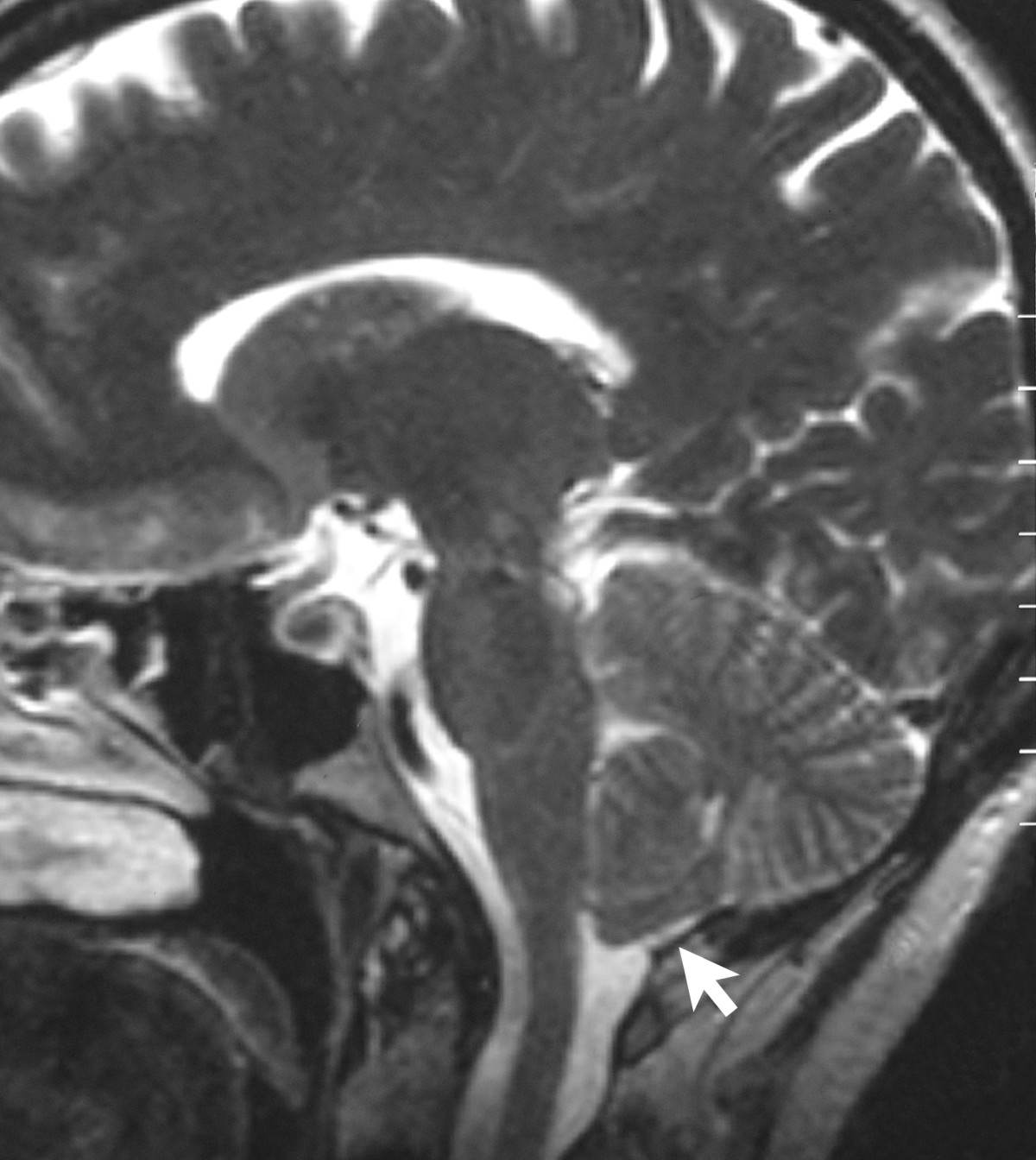
A T2-weighted sagittal MRI scan, from a patient with Chiari-like symptomatology, demonstrating tonsillar herniation less than 3 mm

Chronic secondary headache or orofacial pain is a result of an underlying disorder. Chronic secondary headache or orofacial pain can be caused by ischemic stroke, nontraumatic intracranial hemorrhage, arteritis, unruptured vascular malformation, pituitary apoplexy, genetic vasculopathy, increased cerebrospinal fluid pressure, Chiari malformation type I, intracranial neoplasms, epileptic seizure, substance withdrawal, bacterial meningitis, meningoencephalitis, viral meningitis or encephalitis, brain abscess, intracranial fungal or other parasitic infections, hypoxia, hypercapnia, dialysis, arterial hypertension, and hypothyroidism.

- Chronic dental pain
- Chronic neuropathic orofacial pain
- Headache or orofacial pain associated with chronic secondary temporomandibular disorders
- Chronic headache or orofacial pain associated with disorders of homoeostasis or their nonpharmacological treatment
- Chronic headache or orofacial pain associated with cranial or cervical vascular disorder
- Chronic headache or orofacial pain associated with non-vascular intracranial disorder
- Chronic headache associated with a substance or its withdrawal
- Chronic headache or orofacial pain attributed to trauma or injury to the head and/or neck
- Chronic headache or orofacial pain attributed to infection

=== Chronic secondary visceral pain ===
Chronic secondary visceral pain refers to reoccurring or persisting pain caused by organs in the thoracic, abdominal, and pelvic cavities.

==== Chronic visceral pain from mechanical factors ====
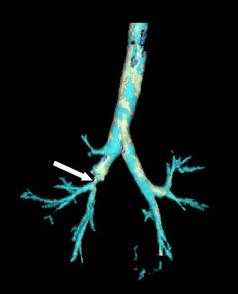
Bronchial stenosis after surgery in a patient with complete disruption of the right bronchus.

Chronic visceral pain from mechanical factors is caused by external compression of internal organs, internal organ traction involving ligaments and vessels, or internal obstructions, such as stones or stenosis, which can block hollow viscera and cause dilation above the obstruction.

- Chronic visceral pain from mechanical factors in the head or neck region
- Chronic visceral pain from mechanical factors in the thoracic region
- Chronic visceral pain from mechanical factors in the abdominal region
- Chronic visceral pain from mechanical factors in the pelvic region

==== Chronic visceral pain from vascular mechanisms ====
Chronic visceral pain from vascular mechanisms is caused by changes in the arterial or venous blood vessels that supply blood to the viscera of the thoracic, abdominal, and pelvic cavities and the head or neck region. It can also be caused by a disorder of the vascular system that causes pain in other areas of the body.

- Chronic visceral pain from vascular mechanisms in the head or neck region
- Chronic visceral pain from vascular mechanisms in the thoracic region
- Chronic visceral pain from vascular mechanisms in the abdominal region
- Chronic visceral pain from vascular mechanisms in the pelvic region

==== Chronic visceral pain from persistent inflammation ====
Chronic visceral pain from persistent inflammation is pain caused by chronic inflammation of internal organs. This inflammation can be caused by noninfectious, infectious, or autoimmune mechanisms.

- Chronic visceral pain from persistent inflammation in the head or neck region
- Chronic visceral pain from persistent inflammation in the thoracic region
- Chronic visceral pain from persistent inflammation in the abdominal region
- Chronic visceral pain from persistent inflammation in the pelvic region

=== Chronic secondary musculoskeletal pain ===
Chronic secondary musculoskeletal pain can be caused by a variety of conditions, including chronic nociception in the vertebral column, joints, bones, muscles, tendons, and soft tissues, as well as deep somatic lesions.

==== Chronic secondary musculoskeletal pain from persistent inflammation ====
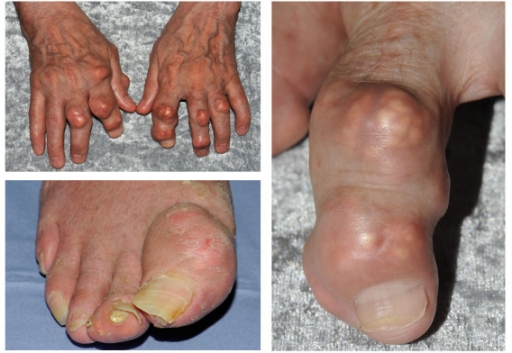
Tophaceous gout affecting the right great toe and finger interphalangeal joints.

One of the main causes of many musculoskeletal disorders is inflammation. Similarly, one of the main causes of persistent musculoskeletal pain is ongoing inflammation. Inflammation-related pain symptoms include heightened sensitivity to stimuli in the afflicted area. In rheumatological disorders with inflammation as the principal pathophysiological mechanism, chronic secondary musculoskeletal pain can be the main symptom.

- Chronic secondary musculoskeletal pain from persistent inflammation due to infection
- Chronic secondary musculoskeletal pain from persistent inflammation due to crystal deposition
- Chronic secondary musculoskeletal pain from persistent inflammation due to autoimmune and auto-inflammatory disorders

==== Chronic secondary musculoskeletal pain associated with structural changes ====
Chronic secondary musculoskeletal pain associated with structural changes can be attributed to modifications in the structure of a joint, bone, or tendon. The structural alteration can be seen on imaging or determined from a clinical assessment.

- Chronic secondary musculoskeletal pain associated with osteoarthritis
- Chronic secondary musculoskeletal pain associated with spondylosis
- Chronic pain after musculoskeletal injury

==== Chronic secondary musculoskeletal pain due to disease of the nervous system ====
Chronic secondary musculoskeletal pain due to disease of the nervous system is associated with central or peripheral nervous system conditions that are categorized elsewhere. It involves pain brought on by changes in sensory and motor function.

- Chronic secondary musculoskeletal pain associated with Parkinson's disease
- Chronic secondary musculoskeletal pain associated with multiple sclerosis
- Chronic secondary musculoskeletal pain associated with peripheral neurologic disease
