= Analgesic adjuvant =

Medication used for other purposes that additionally has analgesic effects

An analgesic adjuvant is a medication that is typically used for indications other than pain control but provides control of pain (analgesia) in some painful diseases. This is often part of multimodal analgesia, where one of the intentions is to minimize the need for opioids.

== Rationale ==
Multimodal analgesia refers to the use of multiple classes of medications in order to treat pain from different molecular mechanisms at once. Prolonged use of higher doses of opioids is associated with increased risk of tolerance and opioid use disorder, so there is a growing trend in the use of multimodal analgesia to treat pain.

== Types ==
=== Anticonvulsants ===
Anticonvulsants work through blockade of sodium and calcium ion channels to reduce glutamate (excitatory neurotransmitter) release. Nociceptor hyper-excitability, due to damage to pain-transmitting neurons, results in chronic neuropathic pain. Common anticonvulsants used to treat neuropathy are gabapentinoids (calcium channel blockers) and carbamazapine (sodium channel blocker). There is some evidence that anticonvulsants may also help with inflammatory pain through reduction of nociceptor hyper-excitability originally due to damage to surrounding tissue.

- Examples:
  - Gabapentin
  - Pregabalin
  - Carbamazepine: FDA-approved for trigeminal neuralgia

=== Antidepressants ===
Antidepressants act (as treatment for both depression and pain) by modulating serotonin and norepinephrine neurotransmitter metabolism. Descending serotonin pathways in the spinal cord are implicated in modulation of pain perception, especially in chronic pain. Common agents used are serotonin-norepinephrine reuptake inhibitors (SNRIs) and tricyclic antidepressants (TCAs). Duloxetine, venlafaxine, and amitriptyline are all FDA-approved for chronic musculoskeletal pain, peripheral neuropathy, and fibromyalgia).

- Examples:
  - Duloxetine
  - Venlafaxine
  - Amitriptyline

=== Muscle relaxants ===
Over-excitation of skeletal muscle can result in spasticity (increased muscle tone) and/or muscle spasms (involuntary muscle contractions) which may contribute to pain. There are several different types of muscle relaxants used for pain with different mechanisms of action. Muscle relaxants often have sedating effect that contributes to analgesia and improved relaxation. Experts disagree over whether muscle relaxants are useful for acute musculoskeletal pain.

- Examples:
  - Cyclobenzaprine
  - Methocarbamol
  - Tizanidine
  - Baclofen
  - Carisoprodol: also active centrally and reduces perception of pain
  - Diazepam

=== Alpha-2 adrenergic agonists ===
Alpha-2 adrenergic agonists such as clonidine are traditionally used to treat hypertension via inhibition of norepinephrine release. Central alpha-2 adrenergic activation in the locus ceruleus and spinal cord induce sedation and pain modulation respectively. Clonidine has been shown to have some efficacy when treating both acute and chronic pain.

- Examples:
  - Clonidine
  - Tizanidine: also considered a muscle relaxant
