= Burning mouth syndrome =

Human disease

- Other names: Glossodynia, orodynia, oral dysaesthesia, glossopyrosis, stomatodynia, burning tongue, stomatopyrosis, sore tongue, burning tongue syndrome, burning mouth, or sore mouth
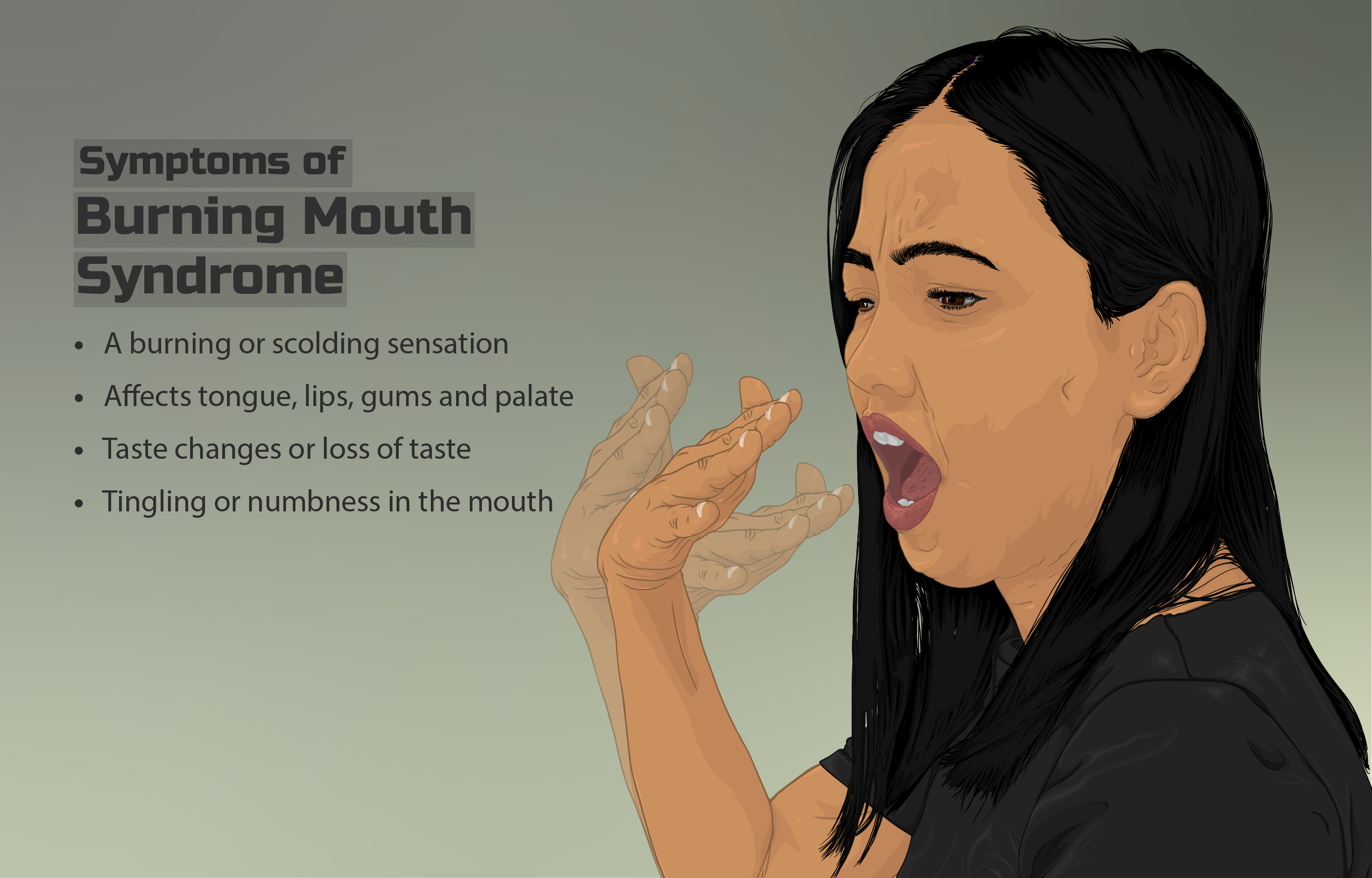
- Depiction of a person suffering from Burning Mouth Syndrome.
- Specialty: Oral medicine

Burning mouth syndrome (BMS) is a burning, tingling or scalding sensation in the mouth, lasting for at least four to six months, with no underlying known dental or medical cause. No related signs of disease are found in the mouth. People with burning mouth syndrome may also have a subjective xerostomia (dry mouth sensation where no cause can be found such as reduced salivary flow), paraesthesia (altered sensation such as tingling in the mouth), or an altered sense of taste or smell.

A burning sensation in the mouth can be a symptom of another disease when local or systemic factors are found to be implicated; this is not considered to be burning mouth syndrome, which is a syndrome of medically unexplained symptoms. The International Association for the Study of Pain defines burning mouth syndrome as "a distinctive nosological entity characterized by unremitting oral burning or similar pain in the absence of detectable mucosal changes" and "burning pain in the tongue or other oral mucous membranes", and the International Headache Society defines it as "an intra-oral burning sensation for which no medical or dental cause can be found". To ensure the correct diagnosis of burning mouth syndrome, Research Diagnostic Criteria (RDC/BMS) have been developed.

Insufficient evidence leaves it unclear if effective treatments exist.

== Signs and symptoms ==
By definition, BMS has no signs. Sometimes affected persons will attribute the symptoms to sores in the mouth, but these are in fact normal anatomic structures (e.g. lingual papillae, varices). Symptoms of BMS are variable, but the typical clinical picture is given below, considered according to the Socrates pain assessment method (see table). If clinical signs are visible, then another explanation for the burning sensation may be present. Erythema (redness) and edema (swelling) of papillae on the tip of the tongue may be a sign that the tongue is being habitually pressed against the teeth. The number and size of filiform papillae may be reduced. If the tongue is very red and smooth, then there is likely a local or systemic cause (e.g. erythematous candidiasis, anemia).

Parameter	Usual findings in burning mouth syndrome.
Site	Usually bilaterally located on the tongue or less commonly the palate, lips or lower alveolar mucosa
Onset	Pain is chronic, and rarely spontaneously remits
Character	Burning, scalded or tingling. Sometimes the sensation is described as 'discomfort', 'tender', 'raw' and 'annoying' rather than pain or burning.
Radiation	
Associations	Possibly subjective xerostomia, dysgeusia (altered taste), thirst, headaches, chronic back pain, irritable bowel syndrome, dysmenorrhea, globus pharyngeus, anxiety, decreased appetite, depression and personality disorders
Time course	Type 2 (most common) pain upon waking and throughout day, less commonly other patterns.
Exacerbating/Relieving factors	Possible exacerbating factors (make the pain worse) include tension, fatigue, speaking, and hot, acidic or spicy foods. Possible relieving factors include sleeping, cold, distraction, and alcohol. The pain is often relieved by eating and drinking (unlike pain caused by organic lesions or neuralgia) or when the person's attention is occupied. Temporary relief while eating is described as "almost pathognomonic" by the IASP. Pain is not often relieved by systemic analgesics, but can sometimes be relieved by topical anesthetics.
Severity	Moderate to severe, rated 5–8 out of 10, similar in intensity to toothache
Effect on sleep	May not disturb sleep, or may change sleep patterns, e.g. insomnia.
Previous treatment	Often multiple consultations and unsuccessful attempts at dental and/or medical treatment

== Causes ==
=== Theories ===
In about 50% of cases of burning mouth sensation no identifiable cause is apparent; these cases are termed (primary) BMS. Several theories of what causes BMS have been proposed, and these are supported by varying degrees of evidence, but none is proven. As most people with BMS are postmenopausal women, one theory of the cause of BMS is of estrogen or progesterone deficit, but a strong statistical correlation has not been demonstrated. Another theory is that BMS is related to autoimmunity, as abnormal antinuclear antibody and rheumatoid factor can be found in the serum of more than 50% of persons with BMS, but these levels may also be seen in elderly people who do not have any of the symptoms of this condition. Whilst salivary flow rates are normal and there are no clinical signs of a dry mouth to explain a complaint of dry mouth, levels of salivary proteins and phosphate may be elevated and salivary pH or buffering capacity may be reduced.

Depression and anxiety are strongly associated with BMS. It is not known if depression is a cause or result of BMS, as depression may develop in any setting of constant unrelieved irritation, pain, and sleep disturbance. It is estimated that about 20% of BMS cases involve psychogenic factors, and some consider BMS a psychosomatic illness, caused by cancerophobia, concern about sexually transmitted infections, or hypochondriasis.

Chronic low-grade trauma due to parafunctional habits (e.g. rubbing the tongue against the teeth or pressing it against the palate), may be involved. BMS is more common in persons with Parkinson's disease, so it has been suggested that it is a disorder of reduced pain threshold and increased sensitivity. Often people with BMS have unusually raised taste sensitivity, termed hypergeusia ("super tasters"). Dysgeusia (usually a bitter or metallic taste) is present in about 60% of people with BMS, a factor which led to the concept of a defect in sensory peripheral neural mechanisms. Changes in the oral environment, such as changes in the composition of saliva, may induce neuropathy or interruption of nerve transduction. The onset of BMS is often spontaneous, although it may be gradual. There is sometimes a correlation with a major life event or stressful period in life. In women, the onset of BMS is most likely three to twelve years following menopause.

=== Other causes of an oral burning sensation ===
Substances capable of causing an oral burning sensation.
Foods and additives
- Benzoic acid
- Chestnuts
- Cinnamaldehyde
- Instant coffee
- Nicotinic acid
- Peanuts
- Sodium metabisulphite
- Sorbic acid

Metals

- Cadmium
- Cobalt chloride
- Mercury
- Nickel
- Palladium

Plastics

- Benzoyl peroxide
- Bisphenol A
- Epoxy resins
- Methyl methacrylate
- Octyl gallate
- Propylene glycol

Several local and systemic factors can give a burning sensation in the mouth without any clinical signs, and therefore may be misdiagnosed as BMS. Some sources state that where there is an identifiable cause for a burning sensation, this can be termed "secondary BMS" to distinguish it from primary BMS. However, the accepted definitions of BMS hold that there are no identifiable causes for BMS, and where there are identifiable causes, the term BMS should not be used.

Some causes of a burning mouth sensation may be accompanied by clinical signs in the mouth or elsewhere on the body. For example, burning mouth pain may be a symptom of allergic contact stomatitis. This is a contact sensitivity (type IV hypersensitivity reaction) in the oral tissues to common substances such as sodium lauryl sulfate, cinnamaldehyde or dental materials. However, allergic contact stomatitis is accompanied by visible lesions and gives positive response with patch testing. Acute (short term) exposure to the allergen (the substance triggering the allergic response) causes non-specific inflammation and possibly mucosal ulceration. Chronic (long term) exposure to the allergen may appear as chronic inflammatory, lichenoid (lesions resembling oral lichen planus), or plasma cell gingivitis, which may be accompanied by glossitis and cheilitis. Apart from BMS itself, a full list of causes of an oral burning sensation is given below:

- Deficiency of iron, folic acid or various B vitamins (glossitis e.g. due to anemia), or zinc
- Neuropathy, e.g. following damage to the chorda tympani nerve.
- Hypothyroidism.
- Medications ("scalded mouth syndrome", unrelated to BMS) – protease inhibitors and angiotensin-converting-enzyme inhibitors (e.g. captopril).
- Type 2 diabetes
- True xerostomia, caused by hyposalivation e.g. Sjögren's syndrome
- Parafunctional activity, e.g. nocturnal bruxism or a tongue thrusting habit.
- Restriction of the tongue by poorly constructed dentures.
- Geographic tongue.
- Oral candidiasis.
- Herpetic infection (herpes simplex virus).
- Fissured tongue.
- Lichen planus.
- Allergies and contact sensitivities to foods, metals, and other substances (see table).
- Hiatal hernia.
- Human immunodeficiency virus.
- Multiple myeloma

== Diagnosis ==
BMS is a diagnosis of exclusion, i.e. all other explanations for the symptoms are ruled out before the diagnosis is made. There are no clinically useful investigations that would help to support a diagnosis of BMS (by definition all tests would have normal results), but blood tests and / or urinalysis may be useful to rule out anemia, deficiency states, hypothyroidism and diabetes. Investigation of a dry mouth symptom may involve sialometry, which objectively determines if there is any reduction of the salivary flow rate (hyposalivation). Oral candidiasis can be tested for with use of a swabs, smears, an oral rinse or saliva samples. It has been suggested that allergy testing (e.g., patch test) is inappropriate in the absence of a clear history and clinical signs in people with a burning sensation in the mouth. The diagnosis of people with burning symptoms may also involve psychologic screening (e.g. depression questionnaires).

The second edition of the International Classification of Headache Disorders lists diagnostic criteria for "Glossodynia and Sore Mouth":

A. Pain in the mouth present daily and persisting for most of the day,
B. Oral mucosa is of normal appearance,
C. Local and systemic diseases have been excluded.

=== Classification ===
A burning sensation in the mouth may be primary (i.e. burning mouth syndrome) or secondary to systemic or local factors. Other sources refer to a "secondary BMS" with a similar definition, i.e. a burning sensation which is caused by local or systemic factors, or "where oral burning is explained by a clinical abnormality". However this contradicts the accepted definition of BMS which specifies that no cause can be identified. "Secondary BMS" could therefore be considered a misnomer. BMS is an example of dysesthesia, or a distortion of sensation.

Some consider BMS to be a variant of atypical facial pain. More recently, BMS has been described as one of the 4 recognizable symptom complexes of chronic facial pain, along with atypical facial pain, temporomandibular joint dysfunction and atypical odontalgia. BMS has been subdivided into three general types, with type two being the most common and type three being the least common. Types one and two have unremitting symptoms, whereas type three may show remitting symptoms.

- Type 1 – Symptoms not present upon waking, and then increase throughout the day
- Type 2 – Symptoms upon waking and through the day
- Type 3 – No regular pattern of symptoms

Sometimes those terms specific to the tongue (e.g. glossodynia) are reserved for when the burning sensation is located only on the tongue.

== Treatment ==
If a cause can be identified for a burning sensation in the mouth, then treatment of this underlying factor is recommended. If symptoms persist despite treatment, a diagnosis of BMS is confirmed. BMS has been traditionally treated by reassurance and with antidepressants, anxiolytics or anticonvulsants. A 2016 Cochrane review of treatment for burning mouth syndrome concluded that strong evidence of an effective treatment was not available, however, a systematic review in 2018 found that the use of antidepressants and alpha-lipoic acids gave promising results.

Other treatments which have been used include atypical antipsychotics, histamine receptor antagonists, and dopamine agonists. Supplementation with vitamin complexes and cognitive behavioral therapy may be helpful in the management of burning mouth syndrome.

The symptoms of burning mouth syndrome can frequently be relieved by topical clonazepam via its action on the ion channel TRPM8.

== Prognosis ==
BMS is benign (importantly, it is not a symptom of oral cancer), but as a cause of chronic pain which is poorly controlled, it can detriment quality of life, and may become a fixation which cannot be ignored, thus interfering with work and other daily activities. Two thirds of people with BMS have a spontaneous partial recovery six to seven years after the initial onset, but in others the condition is permanent. Recovery is often preceded by a change in the character of the symptom from constant to intermittent. No clinical factors predicting recovery have been noted.

If there is an identifiable cause for the burning sensation, then psychological dysfunctions such as anxiety and depression often disappear if the symptom is successfully treated.

== Epidemiology ==
BMS is fairly uncommon worldwide, affecting up to five individuals per 100,000 general population. People with BMS are more likely to be middle aged or elderly, and females are three to seven times more likely to have BMS than males. Some report a female to male ratio of as much as 33 to 1. BMS is reported in about 10–40% of women seeking medical treatment for menopausal symptoms, and BMS occurs in about 14% of postmenopausal women. Males and younger individuals of both sexes are sometimes affected.

Asian and Native American people have considerably higher risk of BMS.

== Notable cases ==
Sheila Chandra, a British singer of Indian heritage, retired due to this condition.
