= Danish Headache Center =

Coordinates: 55°40′21″N 12°23′36″E

The Danish Headache Center (DHC) is an academic medical center at Rigshospitalet in Copenhagen, Denmark. It was founded in 2001 and currently employs more than 100 health care professionals, scientists and administrative staff. The DHC focuses on health care services, education, and research related to headache disorders and facial pains.

== Clinical Activities ==
The DHC offers specialized and multidisciplinary approaches to clinical management of headache disorders and facial pains. The clinical unit is led by Professor Rigmor Jensen, Associate Professor Lars Bendtsen, and Team Leader Helle Jensby.

== Educational Activities ==
The DHC hosts the international Master of Headache Disorders Programme in collaboration with the University of Copenhagen.

The Danish Knowledge Center on Headache Disorders also resides at the DHC and aims to increase awareness on headache disorders in Denmark as well as organize educational activities.
