= Atypical facial pain =

- Other names: atypical facial neuralgia, chronic idiopathic facial pain, psychogenic facial pain phantom tooth pain, psychogenic toothache, persistent dentoalveolar pain disorder
- Specialty: Neurology

Atypical facial pain (AFP) is a type of chronic facial pain which does not fulfill any other diagnosis. There is no consensus as to a globally accepted definition, and there is even controversy as to whether the term should be continued to be used. Both the International Headache Society (IHS) and the International Association for the Study of Pain (IASP) have adopted the term persistent idiopathic facial pain (PIFP) to replace AFP. In the 2nd Edition of the International Classification of Headache Disorders (ICHD-2), PIFP is defined as "persistent facial pain that does not have the characteristics of the cranial neuralgias ... and is not attributed to another disorder." However, the term AFP continues to be used by the World Health Organization's 10th revision of the International Statistical Classification of Diseases and Related Health Problems and remains in general use by clinicians to refer to chronic facial pain that does not meet any diagnostic criteria and does not respond to most treatments.

The main features of AFP are: no objective signs, negative results with all investigations/ tests, no obvious explanation for the cause of the pain, and a poor response to attempted treatments. AFP has been described variably as a medically unexplained symptom, a diagnosis of exclusion, a psychogenic cause of pain (e.g. a manifestation of somatoform disorder), and as a neuropathy. AFP is usually burning and continuous in nature, and may last for many years. Depression and anxiety are often associated with AFP, which are either described as a contributing cause of the pain, or the emotional consequences of suffering with unrelieved, chronic pain. For unknown reasons, AFP is significantly more common in middle aged or elderly people, and in females.

Atypical odontalgia (AO) is very similar in many respects to AFP, with some sources treating them as the same entity, and others describing the former as a sub-type of AFP. Generally, the term AO may be used where the pain is confined to the teeth or gums, and AFP when the pain involves other parts of the face. As with AFP, there is a similar lack of standardization of terms and no consensus regarding a globally accepted definition surrounding AO. Generally definitions of AO state that it is pain with no demonstrable cause which is perceived to be coming from a tooth or multiple teeth, and is not relieved by standard treatments to alleviate dental pain.

Depending upon the exact presentation of atypical facial pain and atypical odontalgia, it could be considered as craniofacial pain or orofacial pain. It has been suggested that, in truth, AFP and AO are umbrella terms for a heterogenous group of misdiagnosed or not yet fully understood conditions, and they are unlikely to each represent a single, discrete condition.

== Signs and symptoms ==
Some sources list some non-specific signs that may be associated with AFP/AO. These include increased temperature and tenderness of the mucosa in the affected area, which is otherwise normal in every regard.

Patient often reports symptoms of paresthesia, pain, and throbbing. Physical examination may be normal, but hypoesthesia, hyperesthesia, and allodynia may be found.

The features of atypical facial pain can be considered according to the Socrates pain assessment method (see table).

Parameter	Usual findings in atypical facial pain/atypical odontalgia
Site	The pain is often poorly localized, but is usually located in the region of the maxilla (upper jaw), which is affected more than the mandibular region, although sometimes both may be affected. The pains location does not correlate to the anatomic distribution of trigeminal nerve, and may be located unilaterally (more usually) or bilaterally. Sometimes the pain may be seem to be located in a tooth that has been previously extracted, or associated with a previous surgical procedure. Over time the pain may migrate, spontaneously or as a response to interventions, to other sites, or slowly expand. Where the teeth are involved, usually a whole quadrant is affected.
Onset	Usually present continuously for months or years, with intermittent periods of increased pain, and an overall gradual increase in pain over time. Sometimes the onset may be mistakenly attributed by the individual to a dental procedure in the past.
Character	Usually described as dull, aching pain. Sometimes the pain is hard to describe, and affected individuals resort to emotive words to describe the pain. Other descriptions include "gripping", "gnawing", "nagging", "vice-like", "crushing", "burning", "deep" or "pressure".
Radiation	The pain may radiate in anatomically impossible ways, e.g. crossing anatomic borders such as dermatomes or the midline. AFP may extend to involve the temple, neck, or occipital region (the back of the head).
Associations	There is a strong association with depression and anxiety. Sometimes other conditions may be associated, such as irritable bowel syndrome, neck pain, back pain, pelvic pain, fibromyalgia, subjective xerostomia (a dry mouth symptom with no identifiable cause), dysgeusia (bad taste), headaches, dysmenorrhea (excessive period pains), Chronic fatigue syndrome, or Dyspepsia.
Time course	Pain is continuous throughout the day, or less commonly may be intermittent.
Exacerbating/Relieving factors	No usual precipitating or relieving factors. Notably simple analgesics do not usually relieve the pain and there are no "trigger zones" (as with trigeminal neuralgia). Facial movements also do not usually trigger the pain. Stress can make the pain worse.
Severity	The intensity is variable, but usually described (by clinicians) as moderate to severe, and may be as severe as trigeminal neuralgia (but the pain is of different character, especially with regards AFP usually being continuous rather than the paroxysmal pain seen in trigeminal neuralgia).
Effect on sleep	AFP does not usually wake people from sleep.
Previous treatment	Possibly multiple failed attempts at previous medical and/or dental treatment, e.g. tooth extraction. Sometimes a treatment may provide temporary relief, only for the pain to return days or weeks later, or in a different part of the face.

== Causes ==
=== Health care associated ===
Sometimes dental treatment or surgical procedures in the mouth appear to precede the onset of AFP, or sometimes persons with AFP will blame clinicians for their pain.

=== Organic disease ===
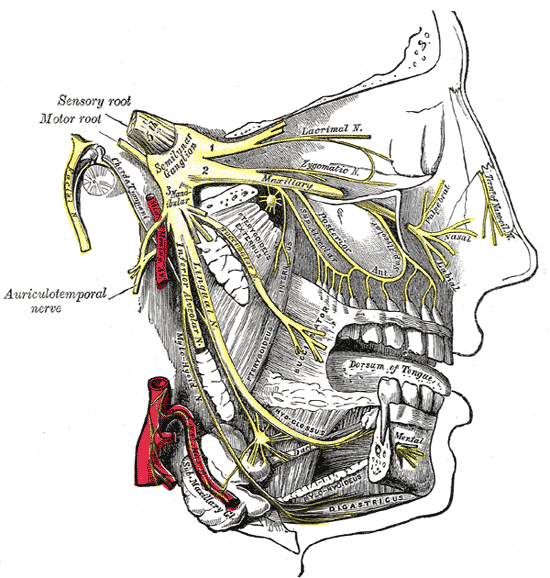
Diagram of the divisions of the trigeminal nerve, the nerve which supplies sensation to the face.

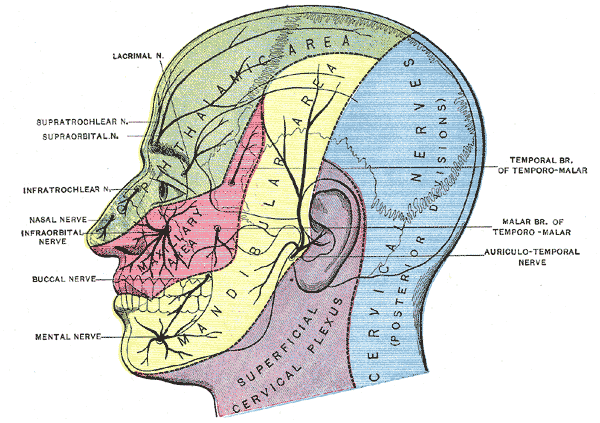
Dermatomes of the head (paired on either side). Green- ophthalmic division, red- maxillary division, yellow- mandibular division.

Many persons with AFP blame organic disease for their pain.

Research in individuals with AFP showed that there is increased cerebral activity (demonstrated during positron emission tomography), possibly suggesting that there is an overactive alerting mechanism to peripheral stimuli. It has been theorized that this can trigger neuropeptides to be released, and the formation of free radicals (capable of damaging cells), the release of eicosanoids (e.g. prostaglandins). There is some suggestion that AFP is an early form of trigeminal neuralgia.

Pain may be referred from other parts of the head or other parts of the body to cause facial pain. Nowhere in the body is referred pain more well illustrated than in the face, and this is due to the richly and complexly innervated nature of the head and neck.

==== "Neuralgia-inducing cavitational osteonecrosis" ====
Neuralgia-inducing cavitational osteonecrosis (NICO) is a controversial term, and it is questioned to exist by many. Osteonecrosis of the jaws refers to the death of bone marrow in the maxilla or the mandible due to inadequate blood supply. It is not necessarily a painful condition, typically there will be no pain at all unless bone necrotic bone becomes exposed to the mouth or through the facial skin, and even then this continues to be painless in some cases. When pain does occur, it is variable in severity, and may be neuralgiform or neuropathic in nature. The term NICO is used to describe pain caused by ischemic osteonecrosis of the jaws, where degenerative extracellular cystic spaces (cavitations inside the bone) are said to develop as a result of ischemia and infarctions in the bone marrow, possibly in relation to other factors such as a hereditary predisposition for thrombus formation within blood vessels, chronic low-grade dental infections and the use of vasoconstrictors in local anesthetics during dental procedures. This proposed phenomenon has been postulated to be the cause of pain in some patients with AFP or trigeminal neuralgia, but this is controversial. NICO is said to be significantly more common in females, and the lesions may or may not be visible on radiographs. When they are visible, the appearance is very variable. About 60% of the lesions appear as a "hot spot" on a technetium 99 bone scan. Proponents of NICO recommend decortication (surgical removal of a section of the cortical plate, originally described as a treatment for osteomyelitis of the jaws) and curettage of the necrotic bone from the cavitation, and in some reported cases, this has relieved the chronic pain. However, NICO appears to show a tendency to recur and develop elsewhere in the jaws. The American Association of Endodontists Research and Scientific Affairs Committee published a position statement on NICO in 1996, stating:

"Most affected sites with a postoperative NICO diagnosis have been in edentulous areas [where the teeth have been lost]. However, some patients with long, frustrating histories of pain associated with endodontically treated teeth have been presented the treatment option of tooth extraction followed by periapical curettage in an attempt to alleviate pain. The American Association of Endodontists cannot condone this practice when NICO is suspected. Because of the lack of clear etiological data, a NICO diagnosis should be considered only as a last resort when all possible local odontogenic causes for facial pain have been eliminated. If a NICO lesion is suspected in relation to an endodontically treated tooth, if possible, periradicular surgery and curettage should be attempted, not extraction. In addition, the practice of recommending the extraction of endodontically treated teeth for the prevention of NICO, or any other disease, is unethical and should be reported immediately to the appropriate state board of dentistry."

==== Atypical trigeminal neuralgia ====
Some suggest that AFP is an early form of trigeminal neuralgia.

=== Psychologic ===
Sometimes stressful life events appear to precede the onset of AFP, such as bereavement or illness in a family member. Hypochondriasis, especially cancerophobia, is also often cited as being involved. Most people with AFP are "normal" people who have been under extreme stress, however other persons with AFP have neuroses or personality disorders, and a small minority have psychoses. Some have been separated from their parents as children.

Depression, anxiety and altered behavior are strongly correlated with AFP. It is argued whether this is a sole or contributing cause of AFP, or the emotional consequences of suffering with chronic, unrelieved pain. It has been suggested that over 50% of people with AFP have concomitant depression or hypochondria. Furthermore, about 80% of persons with psychogenic facial pain report other chronic pain conditions such as listed in the table.

== Diagnosis ==
- Migraine
- Dental diseases
- Neoplasia
- Infection

AFP and AO can be difficult to diagnose, and are often misdiagnosed with resultant inappropriate attempts of treatment, e.g. root canal therapy which may at best have only a temporary benefit, or at worst lead to an increase in the pain. Excluding an organic cause for the pain is the most important part of the diagnosis. Odontogenic pain should especially be ruled out, since this accounts for over 95% of cases of orofacial pain.

There is considerable symptom overlap between atypical facial pain and temporomandibular joint dysfunction.

The diagnosis of facial pain generally is often multidisciplinary.

=== Classification ===
AFP has also been described as a medically unexplained symptom, which are thought by some to be largely psychogenic in nature. However, true psychogenic pain is considered to be rare. Distinction should be made between somatoform disorder, where affected individuals are not inventing the symptom for some benefit, and other conditions like factitious disorder or malingering.

Recent evidence in chronic facial pain research appear to suggest that a proportion of individuals who have been diagnosed with AFP have neuropathic pain,

AFP is described as one of the 4 recognizable symptom complexes of chronic facial pain, along with burning mouth syndrome, temporomandibular joint dysfunction (TMD) and atypical odontalgia. However, there is a degree of overlap between the features of these diagnoses, e.g. between AFP and TMD and burning mouth syndrome.

Atypical odontalgia is similar in nature to AFP, but the latter term generally is used where the pain is confined to the teeth or gums, and AFP when the pain involves other parts of the face. Other sources use atypical odontalgia and AFP as synonyms, or describe atypical odontalgia as a sub-type, variant, or intra-oral equivalent of AFP. Sometimes "phantom tooth pain" is listed as a synonym for AO, and sometimes it is defined as toothache which persists after a tooth has been extracted. It has been suggested that it is likely that these terms do not represent a single, discrete condition, but rather a collection of misdiagnosed and as yet unidentified causes. This pain is often similar to pain from organic dental disease such as periapical periodontitis, or pulpitis (toothache), but unlike normal dental pain, it is not relieved in the long term by dental treatments such as endodontic therapy (root canal treatment) or tooth extraction, and it may even be worsened, return soon after, or simply migrate to other areas in the mouth following dental treatment.

==== Definitions ====
===== Atypical facial pain =====
There is no universally accepted definition of AFP, and it is defined less by what it is as what it is not. Various definitions of AFP include:

- "a nonmuscular or joint pain that has no detectable neurologic cause."
- "a condition characterized by the absence of other diagnoses and causing continuous, variable-intensity, migrating, nagging, deep, and diffuse pain."
- "a continuous unilateral deep aching pain sometimes with a burning component."
- "facial pain not fulfilling other criteria" (previous IHS definition, which now uses the term "Persistent idiopathic facial pain", see below).
- "persistent pain in the maxillofacial region that does not fit the diagnostic criteria of any other orofacial pain and has no identifiable cause." (Neville et al.)

===== Atypical odontalgia =====
There are no globally accepted definitions of AO, but some suggested definitions are listed below:

- "continuous pain in the teeth or in a tooth socket after extraction in the absence of any identifiable dental cause," (International headache society, description included as a side note of "persistent idiopathic facial pain" in the ICHD-2, i.e. with no separate diagnosis for atypical odontalgia).
- "Severe throbbing pain in the tooth without major pathology" (IASP definition in the "Classification of Chronic Pain", listing AO as "tooth pain not associated with lesions").
- "pain and hypersensitive teeth in the absence of detectable pathology".
- "pain of an unidentifiable cause that is perceived to be originating in a tooth or teeth".

==== Naming controversy and proposed replacement terms ====
The term "atypical facial pain" has been criticized. Originally, AFP was intended to describe a group of individuals whose response to neurosurgical procedures was not typical. Some experts in facial pain have suggested that the term AFP be discarded, as it may serve as a catchall phrase to describe either individuals who have not had an adequate diagnostic assessment or individuals whose pain is purely psychogenic. AFP has also been described as an inappropriate term since many cases in this category conform to a recognizable pattern. Another cited reason for discontinuing use of the term AFP is that some cases appear to follow surgeries or injuries involving the face, teeth and gums, possibly suggesting infectious or traumatic etiologies. Some classifications of facial pain avoid the term in favor of other similar terms.

The IHS now use the term "Persistent idiopathic facial pain" in the ICHD-2, defining it as "persistent facial pain that does not have the characteristics of the cranial neuralgias ... and is not attributed to another disorder." The IASP's Classification of Chronic Pain does not have a diagnosis that corresponds to AFP, although it is listed in the differential diagnosis of "Glossodynia and sore mouth" (Burning mouth syndrome). However, in another IASP publication from 2011, the term PIFP is used and defined almost identically to the above. Despite the controversy surrounding the use of the term, it has a long history, and it is still in common use by clinicians to refer to chronic facial pain that does not meet any diagnostic criteria and does not respond to most treatments.

==== Re-classification of trigeminal neuralgia ====
Classification scheme for trigeminal neuralgia (TN) and related facial pain syndromes.
Type	Description
TN1	Classic or typical TN. Idiopathic, spontaneous facial pain which is predominantly episodic in nature
TN2	Atypical TN, or TN type 2. Idiopathic, spontaneous facial pain which is predominantly constant in nature
TN3	Trigeminal neuropathic pain. Results from unintentional injury to the trigeminal nerve from trauma or surgery.
TN4	Trigeminal deafferentation pain. Results from intentional injury to the nerve in an attempt to treat either TN or other related facial pain.
TN5	Symptomatic TN. Results from multiple sclerosis
TN6	Postherpetic TN. Follows a cutaneous herpes zoster outbreak in the trigeminal distribution.
TN7	"Atypical facial pain." Facial pain secondary to a somatoform pain disorder, requiring psychological testing to confirm.

Trigeminal neuralgia is another example of a cause of facial pain. Neuralgia refers to pain in the distribution of a nerve (or nerves), and commonly implies paroxysmal (sudden) pain, although the accepted IASP definition specifies that the term should not be restricted to mean paroxysmal pain. Classic trigeminal neuralgia refers to sudden, shooting pain in the face, which is usually short lived and brought on by accidental stimulation of trigger points on the face, as may occur when washing. Trigeminal neuralgia has been described as one of the most painful conditions possible. Trigeminal neuralgia and AFP are traditionally considered separate, since AFP typically involves constant, often burning pain and trigeminal neuralgia classically shows paroxysmal, shooting pain, but in reality there is some overlap in their features. In 2005 researchers proposed a new classification of trigeminal neuralgia which described a type of trigeminal neuralgia where the pain was constant and burning. They theorized that this type was a progression of untreated classic trigeminal neuralgia, and represented worsening neural injury. There were seven proposed sub-types of trigeminal neuralgia (TN) in this classification (see table), and the final category was reserved for facial pain caused by somatoform disorder. This last category (TN7) was termed atypical facial pain, although many cases that would otherwise be traditionally labelled as AFP would fall into other groups in this classification, especially into the second group. In a publication of the Trigeminal Neuralgia Association (TNA), the following was said about this new classification and AFP:

"The term atypical facial neuralgia or pain was a wastebasket term applied by a serious contributor of a former era to a group of patients he did not understand. Many of these patients were our trigeminal neuralgia type 2 patients. It is unfortunate that many of these people were told they had psychological problems. Many developed psychological problems after the fact when told by everyone that such was their problem. Over the years, our areas of ignorance have progressively narrowed. ... A non-pejorative and, hopefully, reasonable term for the ever-narrowing group of undiagnosed face pain problems: Facepain of Obscure Etiology (FOE or POE) to replace atypical facial pain in the Burchiel classification."

As a result, some sources list terms such as "atypical trigeminal neuralgia", "trigeminal neuropathic pain" and "atypical facial neuralgia" as synonyms of AFP.

=== ICHD-2 Diagnostic criteria ===
The ICHD-2 lists diagnostic criteria for "persistent idiopathic facial pain" (the term that replaces AFP in this classification):

A. Pain in the face, present daily and persisting for all or most of the day, fulfilling criteria B and C,

B. Pain is confined at onset to a limited area on one side of the face, and is deep and poorly localized,

C. Pain is not associated with sensory loss or other physical signs,

D. Investigations including x-ray of face and jaws do not demonstrate any relevant abnormality.

There are presently no accepted medical tests which consistently discriminate between facial pain syndromes or differentiate Atypical Facial Pain from other syndromes. However, a normal Radiograph, CT, and MRI may help to exclude other pathology such as arterio-veinous malformation, tumor, temporomandibular joint disorder, or MS.

== Management ==
=== Psychosocial interventions ===
Psychosocial interventions for AFP include cognitive behavioral therapy and biofeedback. A systematic review reported that there was weak evidence to support the use of these treatments to improve long-term outcomes in chronic orofacial pain, however these results were based primarily upon temporomandibular joint dysfunction and burning mouth syndrome rather than ATP and AO.

Psychosocial interventions assume 2 models of chronic facial pain, namely "inactivity" and "over activity". The former is where people with pain become conditioned to avoid physical activity as a result of exacerbating their pain. These negative thoughts and behaviors in fact prolong and intensify their symptoms. Some psychosocial interventions work on this fear-avoidance behaviour to improve functioning and thereby alleviate symptoms. The over activity model involves factors such as anxiety, depression or anger acting to increase pain by triggering autonomic, visceral and skeletal activity.

=== Medication ===
- Analgesics
- Antidepressants
- Centrally acting muscle relaxants
- Anticonvulsants

=== Surgical ===
Some have suggested that surgery is not an appropriate for treatment for AFP, however the frequent failure medical treatment to relieve pain has occasionally lead surgeons to attempt surgical treatments. Surgery may give a temporary remission from pain, but rarely is there a long term cure achieved via these measures. Sometimes the pain may be increased or simply migrate to an adjacent area following a surgical procedure. Descriptions of procedures such as removal of a portion of the affected branch of the trigeminal nerve, or direct injections of a caustic substance (e.g. phenol, glycerol, alcohol) into the nerve have been reported. Proponents of the so-called "Neuralgia inducing cavitational necrosis" suggest surgical exploration of the bone marrow surrounding the intra-bony course of the affected nerve to discover diseased marrow.

== Prognosis ==
Research suggests that people with AFP are not helped greatly by health care professionals. One study reported that on average, individuals had consulted 7.5 different doctors. 91% had seen dentists, 80% physicians, 66% neurologists, 63% ear, nose and throat surgeons, 31% orthopedic and maxillofacial surgeons, 23% psychiatrists, 14% neurosurgeons and 6% ophthalmologists and dermatologists. In this study, the individuals had been subjected to a wide variety of different treatments, from surgery, antidepressants, analgesics and physical therapies. None of the persons reported that surgery was beneficial, and in many cases the pain was worsened by surgery. The article cited as the source of this information was withdrawn from publication, saying the information was out of date and not meeting Cochrane methodological standards.

It has been suggested that the onset of chronic facial pain will likely be a life changing development for those affected.

== Epidemiology ==
AFP is sometimes described as being fairly common, and one estimated prevalence is about 1–2% of the general population. However, the IASP described PIFP as being rare, less common than trigeminal neuralgia (which has a prevalence of about 0.01–0.3% in the general population), and possessing no available epidemiologic data for estimated prevalence in the general population. The predominant age group is 30–50, and females are more often affected than males, with most reports stating that about 80% of people with AFP are female.
