= Cracked tooth syndrome =

- Other names: Cracked cusp syndrome, split tooth syndrome, incomplete fracture of posterior teeth
- Cross-section of a posterior tooth.
- Specialty: Dentistry

Cracked tooth syndrome (CTS) is where a tooth has incompletely cracked but no part of the tooth has yet broken off. Sometimes it is described as a greenstick fracture. The symptoms are very variable, making it a notoriously difficult condition to diagnose.

== Classification and definition ==
Cracked tooth syndrome could be considered a type of dental trauma and also one of the possible causes of dental pain. One definition of cracked tooth syndrome is "a fracture plane of unknown depth and direction passing through tooth structure that, if not already involving, may progress to communicate with the pulp and/or periodontal ligament."

== Signs and symptoms ==
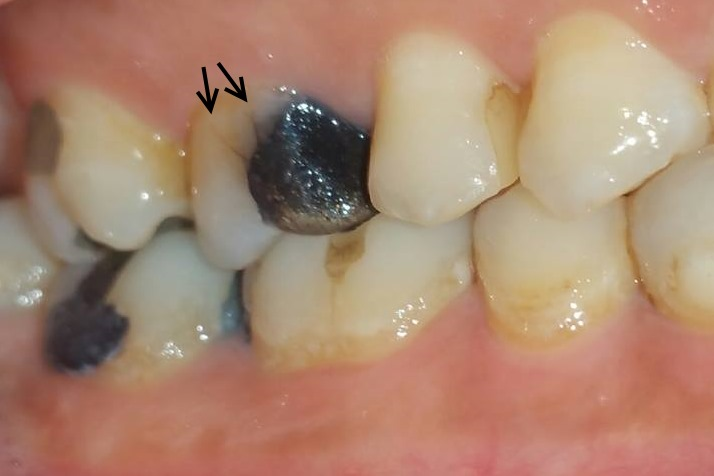
Tooth crack in the upper first molar tooth in a patient with bruxism.

The reported symptoms are very variable, and frequently have been present for many months before the condition is diagnosed. Reported symptoms may include some of the following:

- Sharp pain when biting on a certain tooth, which may get worse if the applied biting force is increased. Sometimes the pain on biting occurs when the food being chewed is soft with harder elements, e.g. seeded bread.
- "Rebound pain" i.e. sharp, fleeting pain occurring when the biting force is released from the tooth, which may occur when eating fibrous foods.
- Pain on biting
- Pain when grinding the teeth backward and forward and side to side.
- Sharp pain when drinking cold beverages or eating cold foods, lack of pain with heat stimuli.
- Pain when eating or drinking sugary substances.
- Sometimes the pain is well localized, and the individual is able to determine the exact tooth from which the symptoms are originating, but not always.

If the crack propagates into the pulp, irreversible pulpitis, pulpal necrosis and periapical periodontitis may develop, with the respective associated symptoms.

== Pathophysiology ==
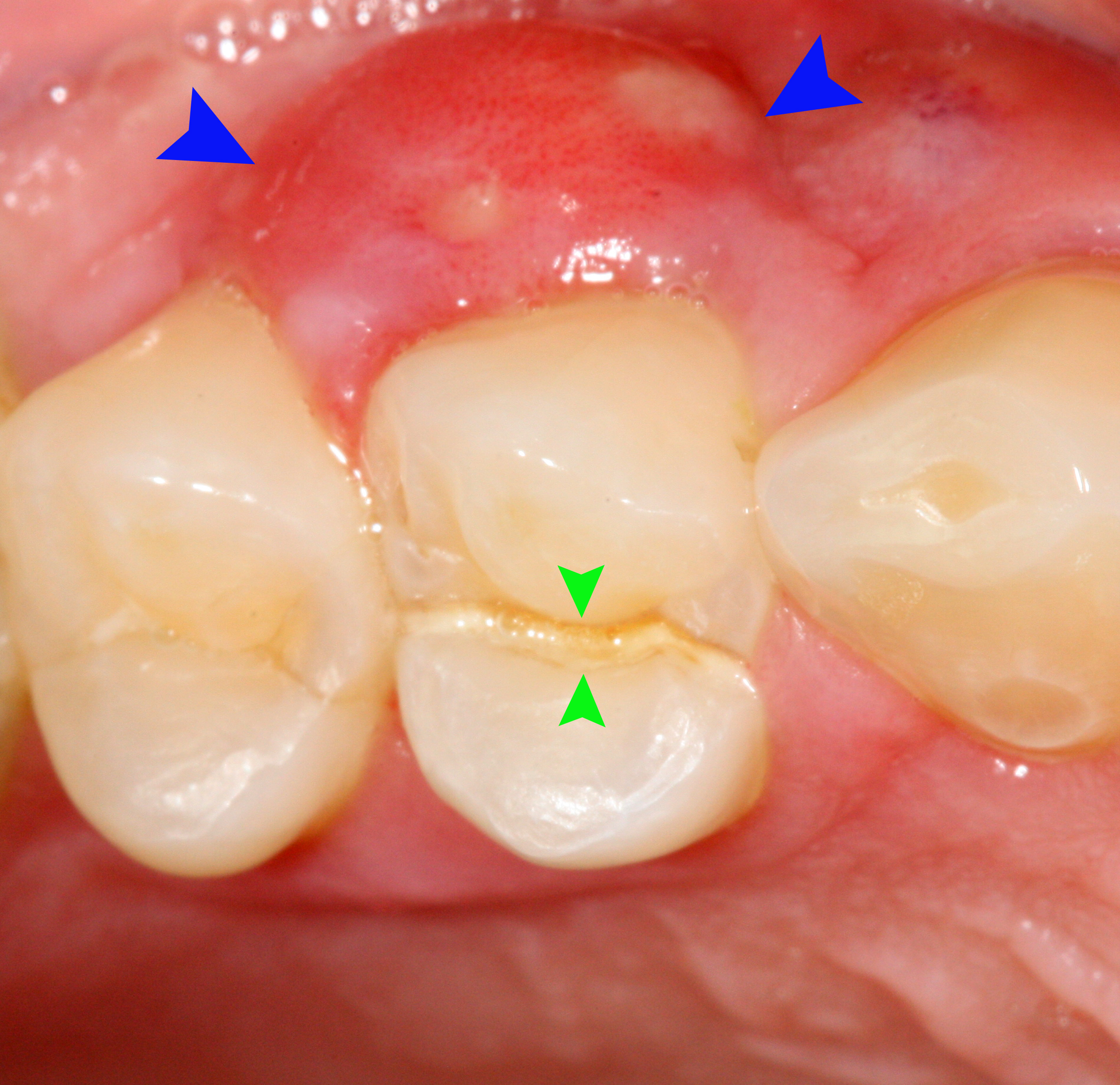
Crack (vertical fracture) of tooth and root #1.4 (green arrows) splitting it in two even pieces which has caused a lateral periodontal abscess (blue arrows).

CTS is typically characterized by pain when releasing biting pressure on an object. This is because when biting down the segments are usually moving apart and thereby reducing the pressure in the nerves in the dentin of the tooth. When the bite is released the "segments" snap back together sharply increasing the pressure in the intradentin nerves causing pain. The pain is often inconsistent, and frequently hard to reproduce. Pain associated with CTS has been reported to occur more commonly on biting, rather than on release of pressure after biting. If untreated, CTS can lead to severe pain, possible pulpal death, abscess, and even the loss of the tooth.

If the fracture propagates into the pulp, this is termed a complete fracture, and pulpitis and pulp death may occur. If the crack propagates further into the root, a periodontal defect may develop, or even a vertical root fracture.

According to one theory, the pain on biting is caused by the 2 fractured sections of the tooth moving independently of each other, triggering sudden movement of fluid within the dentinal tubules. This activates A-type nociceptors in the dentin-pulp complex, reported by the pulp-dentin complex as pain. Another theory is that the pain upon cold stimuli results from leak of noxious substances via the crack, irritating the pulp.

== Diagnosis ==
Cracked tooth syndrome (CTS) was defined as 'an incomplete fracture of a vital posterior tooth that involves the dentine and occasionally extends to the pulp' by Cameron in 1964 and more recently has included 'a fracture plane of unknown depth and direction passing through tooth structure that, if not already involving, may progress to communicate with the pulp and/or periodontal ligament'. The diagnosis of cracked tooth syndrome is notoriously difficult even for experienced clinicians. The features are highly variable and may mimic sinusitis, temporomandibular disorders, headaches, ear pain, or atypical facial pain/atypical odontalgia (persistent idiopathic facial pain). When diagnosing cracked tooth syndrome, a dentist takes many factors into consideration. Effective management and good prognosis of cracked teeth is linked to prompt diagnosis. A detailed history may reveal pain on release of pressure when eating or sharp pain when consuming cold food and drink. There are a variety of habits which predispose patients to CTS including chewing ice, pens and hard sweets etc. Recurrent occlusal adjustment of restorations due to discomfort may also be indicative of CTS, alongside a history of extensive dental treatment. Below different techniques used for diagnosing CTS are discussed.

=== Clinical examination ===
Cracks are difficult to see during a clinical exam which may limit diagnosis. However other clinical signs which may lead to the diagnosis of CTS includes wear faceting indicating excessive forces perhaps from clenching or grinding or the presence of an isolated deep periodontal pocket which may symbolise a split tooth. Removing restorations may help to visualise fracture lines but should only be carried out after gaining informed consent from the patient, as removing a restoration may prove to be of little diagnostic benefit. Tactile examination with a sharp probe may also aid diagnosis.

=== Gentian violet or methylene blue stains ===
Dyes may be used to aid visualisation of fractures. The technique requires 2–5 days to be effective and a temporary restoration may be required. The structural integrity can be weakened by this method, leading to crack propagation.

=== Transillumination ===
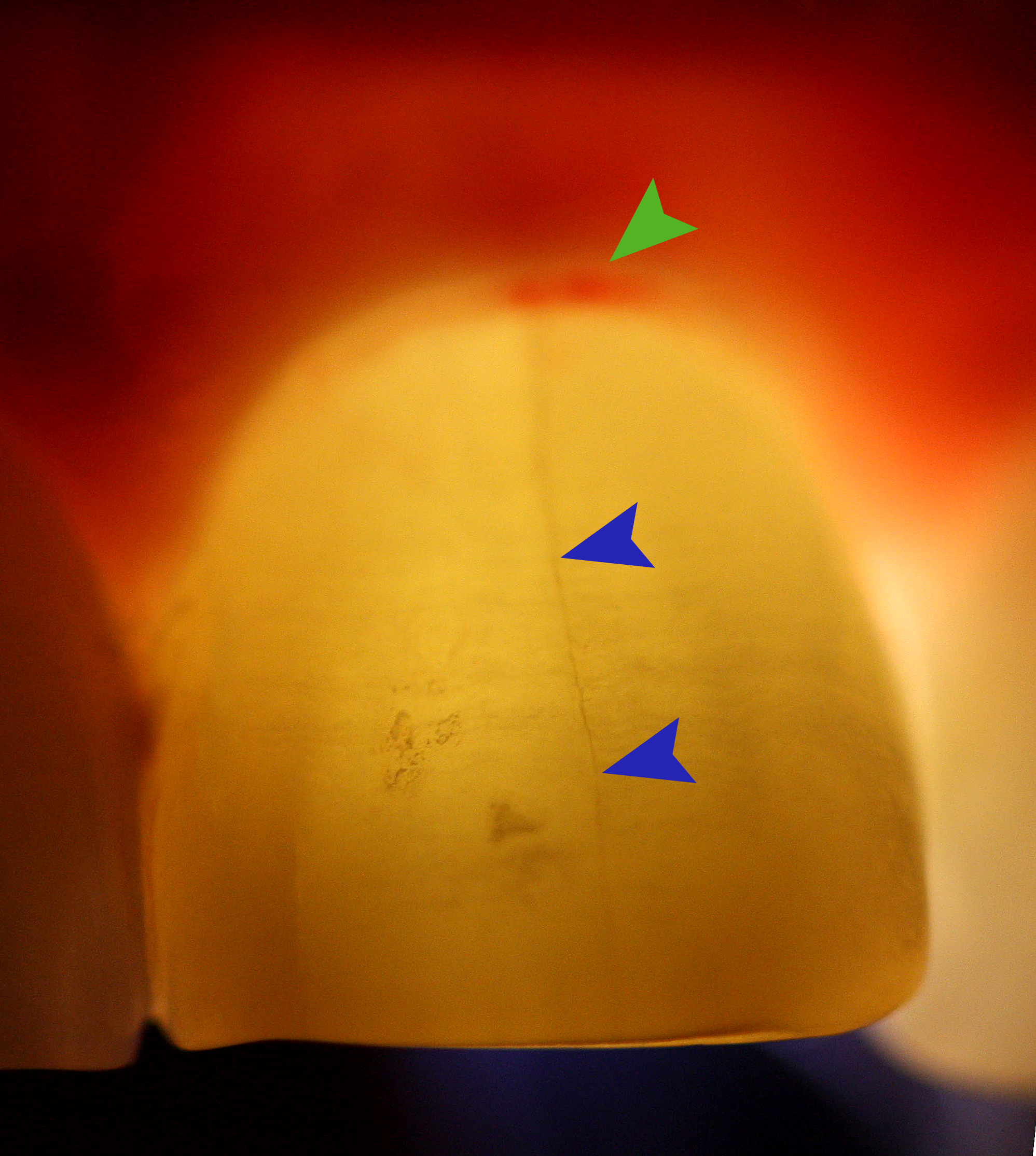
Transillumination of tooth 2.1 showing vertical fracture (blue arrows) and inflammation in marginal gingiva at fracture site (green arrow)

Transillumination is best performed by placing a fibre optic light source directly onto the tooth and optimal results can be achieved with the aid of magnification. Cracks involving dentine interrupt the light transmission. However, transillumination may cause cracks to appear enlarged as well as causing colour changes to become invisible.

=== Radiographs ===
Radiographs offer little benefit in visualising cracks. This is due to the fact that cracks propagate in a direction which is parallel to the plane of the film (Mesiodistal) however radiographs can be useful when examining the periodontal and pulpal status.

=== Bite test ===
Different tools can be used when carrying out a bite test which produce symptoms associated with cracked tooth syndrome. Patients bite down followed by sudden release of pressure. CTS diagnosis is confirmed by pain on release of pressure. The involved cusp can be determined by biting on individual cusps separately. Tooth Slooth II (Professional Results Inc., Laguna Niguel, CA, USA) and Fractfinder (Denbur, Oak Brook, IL, USA) are commercially available tools.

== Epidemiology ==
Aetiology of CTS is multifactorial, the causative factors include:

- previous restorative procedures.
- occlusal factors; bruxism or clenching increases the risk of cracked teeth.
- developmental conditions/anatomical considerations.
- trauma
- others, e.g., aging dentition or presence of lingual tongue studs.

Most commonly involved teeth are mandibular molars followed by maxillary premolars, maxillary molars and maxillary premolars. in a recent audit, mandibular first molar thought to be most affected by CTS possibly due to the wedging effect of opposing pointy, protruding maxillary mesio-palatal cusp onto the mandibular molar central fissure. Studies have also found signs of cracked teeth following the cementation of porcelain inlays; it is suggested that the debonding of intracoronal restorations may be caused by unrecognized cracks in the tooth.

== Treatments ==
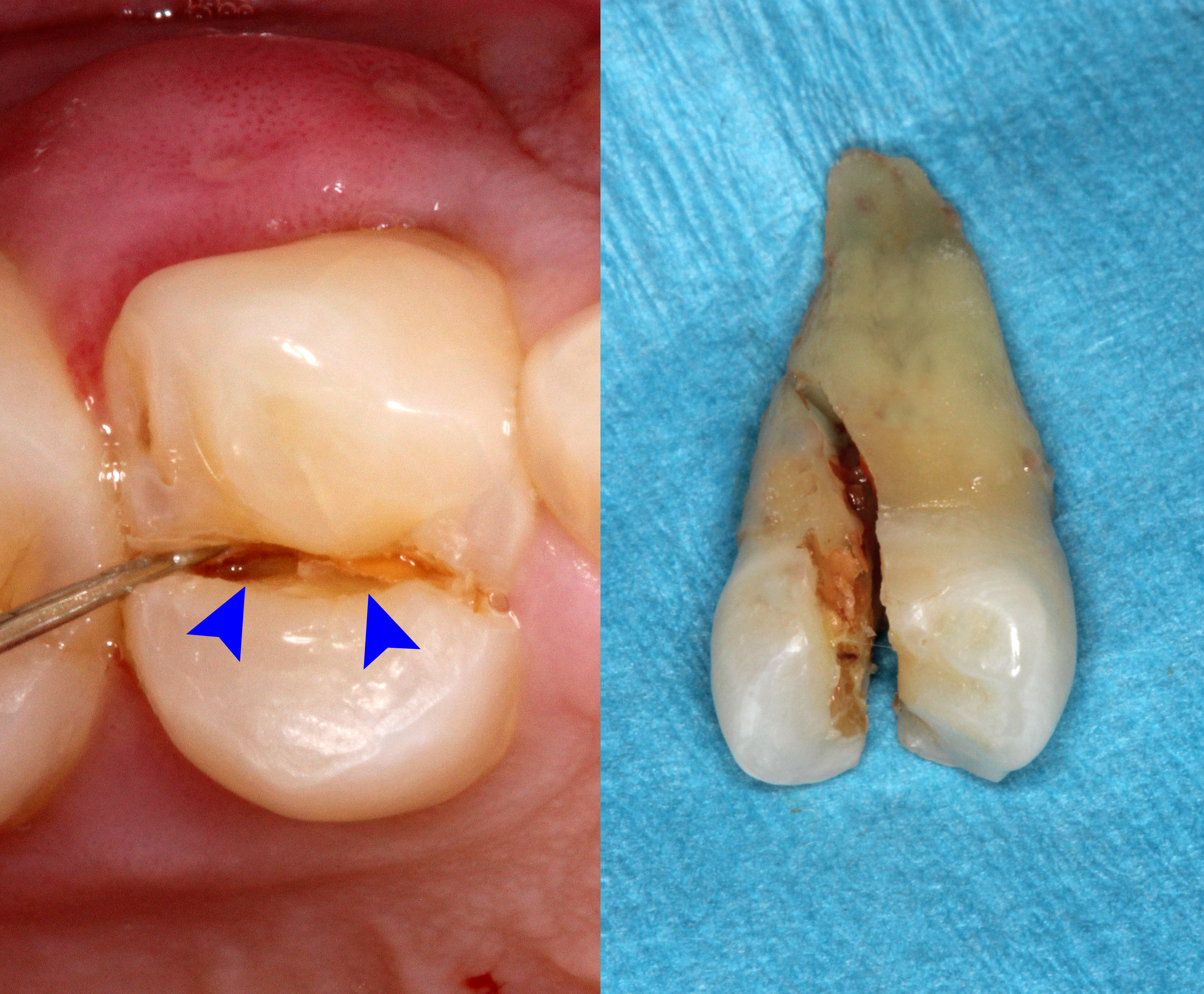
Fractured tooth (blue arrows) viewed in the mouth (left) and after extraction (right).

There is no universally accepted treatment strategy in the treatment of a cracked tooth, as judging the extent of a fracture is challenging. Minor fractures without deep propagation may require no more than observation, as tertiary dentin formation can reinforce and stabilize some fractures not impinging on pulp. Generally, treatments for more severe fractures aim to prevent movement of the segments of the involved tooth so they do not move or flex independently during biting and grinding (stabilization of the crack) to prevent propagation of the crack. Provisionally, a band may be placed around the tooth or a direct composite splint can be placed in supra-occlusion to minimize flexing. Definitive options include:

- Bonded intra-coronal restoration
- Onlay restoration, either direct or indirectly placed (currently the recommended technique)
- Crown restoration (though this is associated with a high incidence of loss of vitality in teeth with CTS)

Teeth originally presenting with CTS may subsequently require root canal therapy (if pain persists after above) or extraction.

== History ==
The term "cuspal fracture odontalgia" was suggested in 1954 by Gibbs. Subsequently, the term "cracked tooth syndrome" was coined in 1964 by Cameron, who defined the condition as "an incomplete fracture of a vital posterior tooth that involves the dentin and occasionally extends into the pulp."
