= Daniele Manfredini =

Italian dentist and academic

- Occupations: Dentist and academic

Academic background
- Education: D.D.S; M.S. Ph.D. Post-Graduate Specialty; Diplomate
- Alma mater: University of Pisa

Academic work
- Institutions: University of Siena

Daniele Manfredini is an Italian dentist and academic. He is a professor of Dentistry and the director of the Orofacial Pain Unit at the University of Siena.

Manfredini's research has centered on temporomandibular disorders (TMDs) and bruxism.

== Education ==
Manfredini received his Degree in Dentistry and Dental Prosthetics (D.D.S) along with his Master of Science in Occlusion and Craniomandibular Disorders from the University of Pisa in 1999 and 2001, respectively. Following this, he received a Ph.D. in Dentistry from the Academic Centre for Dentistry Amsterdam (ACTA) in 2011. He received a Post-Graduate Specialty in Orthodontics from the University of Ferrara in 2017 and obtained Diplomate Status from the American Board of Orofacial Pain in 2021.

== Career ==
Manfredini began his academic career in 2006 as an assistant professor and coordinator of research projects at the TMD clinic at the University of Padua, roles he held until 2016. In 2017, the Italian Ministry of University and Research (MIUR) appointed him to the rank of full professor. Since 2017, he has been working as a professor at the University of Siena. At the same institution, he also holds the position of director at the Orofacial Pain Unit.

Manfredini holds the appointments of lifetime president of the Orofacial Pain Academy, president of the Intl Network for Orofacial Pain and Related Disorders Methodology (INfORM), and vice president of the International Association for Orofacial Pain (IAOFP). He is the founder of the Italian Society of Prosthodontics and Oral Rehabilitation (SIPRO). He is the editor-in-chief of Cranio: The Journal of Craniomandibular & Sleep Practice and the coordinator of the reference document on Temporomandibular Disorders standard of care on behalf of the International Association for Dental Research (IADR). Additionally, for IADR, he was co-coordinator and President of the International Board for the Bruxism Consensus Panel.

== Research ==
Manfredini has authored 360 peer-reviewed journal publications. His research is based on TMDs, bruxism, and orofacial pain, focusing on their etiology, diagnosis, and clinical management. Through clinical research and systematic reviews, he has examined the multifactorial nature of bruxism and highlighted the interactions among biological, psychological, and behavioral factors associated with it. He has also addressed sleep and awake bruxism. Moreover, he has contributed to international efforts to refine the conceptual definition of bruxism and improve its assessment in clinical and research contexts.

Manfredini has studied diagnostic approaches for TMDs, emphasizing the assessment of psychosocial factors such as depression and somatization. He also examined the therapeutic approaches for TMDs with an emphasis on the dismantling of old dogmas centered around the correction of dental occlusion. Additionally, he has examined conservative management strategies, including occlusal splints for TMDs, behavioral interventions for bruxism management, and oral appliances for sleep bruxism. His publications have analyzed the relationship between bruxism and TMDs. He has also contributed to the development of the STAB (Standardized Tool for the Assessment of Bruxism), which is a framework that integrates information related to etiology and clinical consequences.

== Selected articles ==
- Manfredini, Daniele; Lobbezoo, F (2009). "Role of psychosocial factors in the etiology of bruxism". Journal of Orofacial Pain. 23 (2): 153–166. PMID 19492540.
- Manfredini, Daniele; Guarda-Nardini, Luca; Winocur, Ephraim; Piccotti, Fabio; Ahlberg, Jari; Lobbezoo, Frank (2011). "Research diagnostic criteria for temporomandibular disorders: a systematic review of axis I epidemiologic findings". Oral Surgery, Oral Medicine, Oral Pathology, Oral Radiology, and Endodontology. 112 (4): 453–462. doi:10.1016/j.tripleo.2011.04.021. PMID 21835653.
- Manfredini, Daniele; Winocur, Ephraim; Guarda-Nardini, Luca; Paesani, Daniel; Lobbezoo, Frank (2013). "Epidemiology of Bruxism in Adults: A Systematic Review of the Literature". Journal of Orofacial Pain. 27 (2): 99–110. doi:10.11607/jop.921. PMID 23630682.
- Lobbezoo, F.; Ahlberg, J.; Raphael, K. G.; Wetselaar, P.; Glaros, A. G.; Kato, T.; Santiago, V.; Winocur, E.; De Laat, A.; De Leeuw, R.; Koyano, K.; Lavigne, G. J.; Svensson, P.; Manfredini, Daniele (2018). "International consensus on the assessment of bruxism: Report of a work in progress". Journal of Oral Rehabilitation. 45 (11): 837–844. doi:10.1111/joor.12663. PMC 6287494. PMID 29926505.
- Manfredini, Daniele (2024). "The evolution of a field: A challenge and an opportunity". CRANIO. 42 (3): 251–252. doi:10.1080/08869634.2024.2320624. PMID 38409867.
- Manfredini, Daniele; Häggman-Henrikson, Birgitta; Al Jaghsi, Ahmad; Baad-Hansen, Lene; Beecroft, Emma; Bijelic, Tessa; Bracci, Alessandro; Brinkmann, Lisa; Bucci, Rosaria; Colonna, Anna; Ernberg, Malin; Giannakopoulos, Nikolaos N.; Gillborg, Susanna; Greene, Charles S.; Heir, Gary; et al. (2025). "Temporomandibular disorders: INfORM/IADR key points for good clinical practice based on standard of care". CRANIO. 43 (1): 1–5. doi:10.1080/08869634.2024.2405298. PMID 39360749.
