= Yang Chi =

Chinese oral and maxillofacial surgeon

- 杨驰
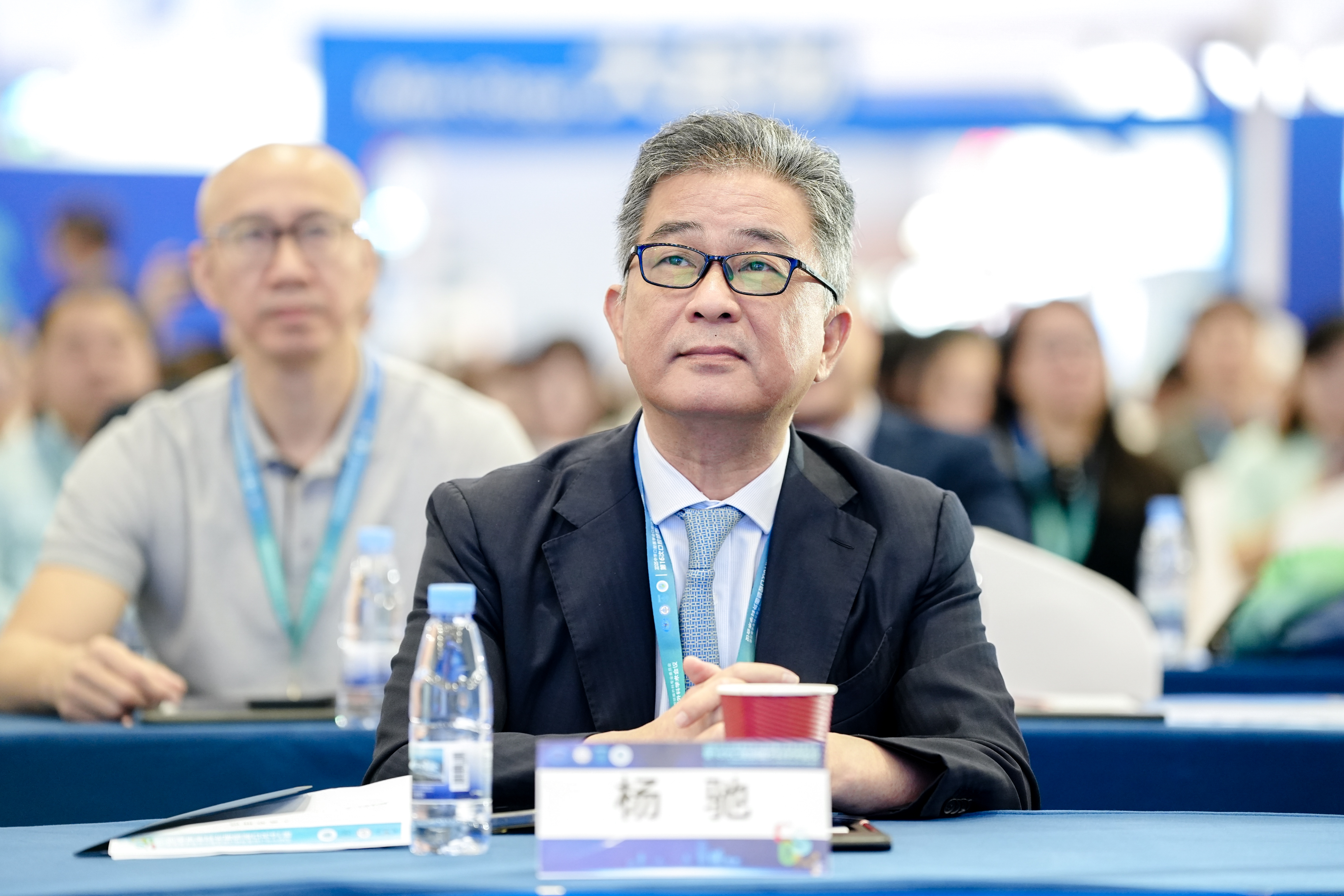
- Occupations: Oral and maxillofacial surgeon
- Employer(s): Shanghai Ninth People's Hospital, Shanghai Jiao Tong University School of Medicine
- Known for: Endoscopic temporomandibular joint (TMJ) surgery

Yang Chi (traditional Chinese: 楊馳; simplified Chinese: 杨驰; pinyin: Yáng Chí) is a Chinese oral and maxillofacial surgeon, and university professor. His research is focused on endoscopic surgical methods for the treatment of temporomandibular joint (TMJ) disorders.

== Early life and career ==
Yang received his Doctor of Dental Surgery and Doctor of Medicine degrees from the Shanghai Jiao Tong University School of Medicine in 1994. He joined the Department of Oral and Maxillofacial Surgery at Shanghai Ninth People's Hospital after graduation and later became a professor.

Between 2000 and 2001, he was a visiting fellow at the University of California (Los Angeles), Massachusetts General Hospital, and the University of Maryland. He currently serves as a Director of the National Clinical Research Centre for Oral Diseases and the National Centre of Stomatology, both supervised by the National Health Commission of China (NHC).

He later became the Vice Director of the Department of Oral and Maxillofacial Surgery at Shanghai Ninth People's Hospital, where he continues his clinical and academic practice.

== Research ==
Yang has published research on minimally invasive approaches to the management of temporomandibular joint disorders, including arthroscopic techniques for disc repositioning. His procedural model integrates closed-joint lavage, disc suturing, and postoperative physiotherapy protocols in the management of TMJ disorders.

Clinical follow-ups of his technique, published in Chinese medical journals, report high stability and improved joint function in long-term outcomes. This technique is used at Shanghai Ninth People's Hospital, where disc-reduction accounts for most TMJ endoscopic procedures.

Yang's research group has also reported work on customized endoscopic instruments and suturing systems for TMJ arthroscopy.

He has contributed to academic publications and textbooks in oral and maxillofacial surgery. His research is often cited in Chinese reference sources and national dental guidelines.

== Recognition ==
- 2021, Second place in the National Science and Technology Progress Award.
- 2024, National Invention Award, First Prize.
