= Orofacial pain =

Pain of the mouth, jaws, or face

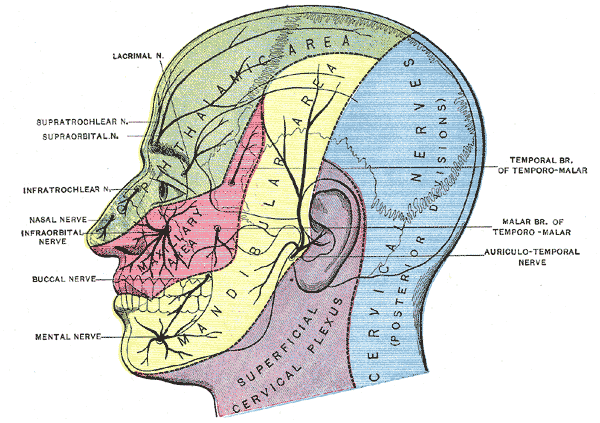
- Dermatomes of the face
- Specialty: ENT surgery, dentistry

Orofacial pain (OFP) is a general term covering any pain which is felt in the mouth, jaws and the face. Orofacial pain is a common symptom, and there are many causes.

Orofacial pain is the specialty of dentistry that encompasses the diagnosis, management and treatment of pain disorders of the jaw, mouth, face and associated regions. These disorders as they relate to orofacial pain include but are not limited to temporomandibular muscle and joint (TMJ) disorders, jaw movement disorders, neuropathic and neurovascular pain disorders, headache, and sleep disorders.

== Classification ==
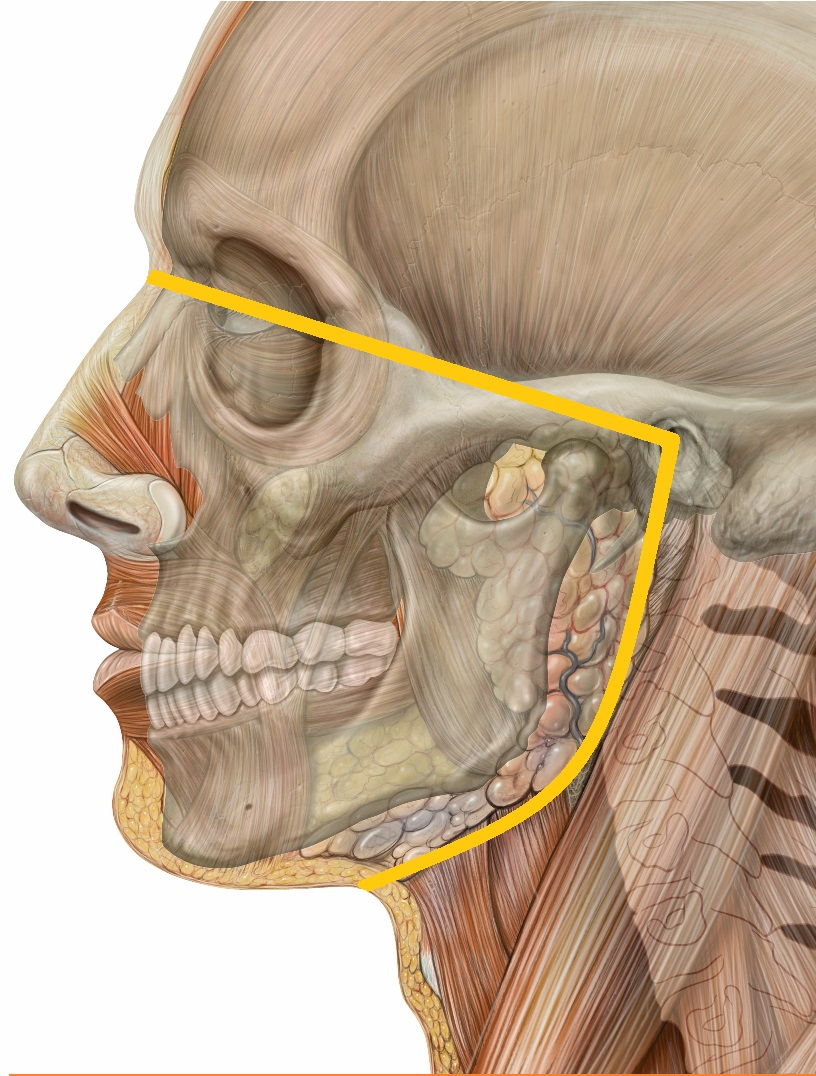
Defined boundaries of the orofacial pain region

International Classification of Diseases (ICD-11) is a new classification coming into effect as of January 1, 2022. It includes chronic secondary headaches and orofacial pain. The classification has been established by a close cooperation between International Association for the Study of Pain (IASP), World Health Organization (WHO) and the International Headache Society (IHS).

There are 4 main classifications prior to ICD-11 which attempt to classify the causes of orofacial pain.

- The International Classification of Headache Disorders third edition (ICHD-3), a publication by the International Headache Society. https://ichd-3.org/
- The Classification of Chronic Pain Second Edition (Revised), a publication by the International Association for the Study of Pain.
- Orofacial Pain: Guidelines for Assessment, Diagnosis, and Management, Fifth Edition by American Academy of Orofacial Pain (AAOP): www.aaop.org.
- The Research Diagnostic Criteria for Temporomandibular Disorders (see TMD).

It has also been suggested that the most basic etiologic classification of orofacial pain is into the following 3 groups:

1. Primarily somatic, arising from musculoskeletal (e.g. TMD pain or periodontal pain) or visceral structures (e.g. pulpal pain or pain from the salivary glands), and transmitted via an intact pain transmission and modulation system.
2. Primarily neuropathic, which occurs as a result of abnormal or damaged pain pathways, e.g. a surgical or traumatic injury to a peripheral nerve.
3. Primarily psychological, which is rare (See: psychogenic pain)

== Diagnosis ==
Diagnosis of orofacial pain can be difficult and can require multiple examinations and histories provided by the patient. The pain history is essential and will indicate any further examinations required.

The correct diagnosis of orofacial pain requires an in-depth pain history which will include:

- Location of the pain
- Timing
- Duration
- Associated symptoms
- Exacerbating and alleviating factors
- Description of the type of pain experienced e.g. dull, aching, throbbing, burning, tingling or pulsating.

Other information and examinations include:

- Full medical history
- Full dental history
- Full social history
- Clinical examination
- Radiographic examination

== Differential diagnosis ==
Clinical presentation of orofacial pain.

=== Dental related ===
- Pulpal
  - Dentinal hypersensitivity resulting from
    - Caries
    - Toothwear
  - Pulp disease (reversible and irreversible pulpitis) resulting from
    - Caries
    - Trauma
- Periapical pathology and periapical acute abscess
- Periodontal
  - Periodontal abscess
  - Pericoronitis and pericoronal abscess
- Cracked tooth syndrome

=== Non-dental related ===
- Musculoskeletal including Temporomandibular diseases (TMD)
- Neuralgias and neuropathies
  - Trigeminal neuralgia
  - Glossopharyngeal neuralgia
  - Sphenopalatine Ganglion neuralgia
  - Sluder's Neuralgia
  - Mental nerve neuralgia
  - Post-injury
  - Burning mouth syndrome
  - Postherpetic neuralgia
- Persistent idiopathic facial pain (atypical facial pain)
  - Atypical odontalgia
- Mucosal
  - Traumatic, immunologic, infective, erosive, ulcerative and vesiculobullous lesions e.g. oral ulceration (e.g. aphthous stomatitis, erosive oral lichen planus, etc.)
- Psychosomatic
- Sinonasal
  - Rhinosinusitis
- Headaches
  - Cluster
  - Migraine
  - Tension-type
  - Neoplastic
  - Aneurysm
- Salivary gland disease
  - Sialadenitis
  - Sialoithiasis
- Cardiac toothache
- Eagle syndrome

== Management ==
A multi-disciplinary approach is needed for orofacial pain disorders involving both non-pharmacological and pharmacological approaches which can be applied to the specific type of disorder. Non-pharmacological approaches can include physical therapies and psychological support to effectively manage the facial pain and reduce the negative impact on quality of life and daily functioning. Self-management interventions, such as education, jaw posture relaxation, and cognitive or behavioral self regulation, have been shown to improve long-term outcomes for patients with orofacial pain, specifically in patients with TMD. Self-Administration of Sphenopalatine Ganglion Blocks (SPG or Pterygopalatine Ganglion) is an excellent approach to a wide variety of orofacial pain conditions.

Often chronic orofacial pain (lasting over 12 weeks) requires referral to a specialised branch of medicine or dentistry or continuation of treatment in a primary care setting, if symptoms cannot be managed otherwise.

- Oral and maxillofacial referral for TMD
- Primary care referral for tension-type headaches
- Neurology referral for migraines and cluster headaches
- Ear Nose and Throat referral for rhinosinusitis and midfacial segment pain

== Epidemiology ==
According to the latest 2026 meta-analysis, orofacial pain remains a common global health problem with an estimated prevalence of 19% for concurrent oral and facial pain, 21% for oral pain, and 12% for facial pain.

Considerable regional differences have been reported. Africa demonstrated a relatively high prevalence of oral pain (31%) and concurrent oral and facial pain (27%), indicating a substantial burden in this region. Similarly, Asia showed high prevalence rates, with 31% of individuals reporting concurrent oral and facial pain, 17% facial pain, and 21% oral pain. South America exhibited the highest prevalence of facial pain (33%), accompanied by 24% oral pain and 26% concurrent oral and facial pain. In contrast, Europe showed comparatively low prevalence across all categories, with rates of 12% for concurrent oral and facial pain, 10% for facial pain, and 16% for oral pain. North America demonstrated relatively stable and moderate prevalence estimates, while preliminary data from Australia suggested lower overall rates of concurrent pain but comparatively higher oral pain prevalence.

Age-related differences indicate a decline in prevalence with increasing age. Concurrent oral and facial pain was most common among individuals younger than 18 years (24%), decreasing to 16% among adults aged 18–60 years and further declining to 10% in those older than 60 years. Sex differences have also been observed, with females demonstrating a higher prevalence (21%) compared with males (15%). The burden appears particularly pronounced among females in Asia and South America, whereas the lowest prevalence has been reported among males in Europe.

The prevalence of orofacial pain also varies according to the duration of the observation period. Reported rates increase with longer observation intervals, ranging from 12–16% during periods of 1–3 months to more than 25% during periods of 6 months or longer.

== Feline orofacial pain syndrome ==
Feline orofacial pain syndrome is a condition in cats characterised by episodic unilateral oral pain and self-mutilation of the tongue. The aetiology is unknown but is believed to be a neuropathic inherited disorder. Common analgesics often do not work well and anti-convulsant analgesics are required to manage pain. The Burmese cat is predisposed.

== See also ==
- Jaw claudication
