= Cancer phobia =

Fear of cancer and contracting cancer

- Specialty: Psychology

Cancer phobia, also known as carcinophobia, is a common phobia and an anxiety disorder characterized by the chronic fear of developing cancer. It can manifest in tremendous feelings of sadness, fear, panic, and distress. In some cases, the phobia can be so extreme that it prevents the individual from living a normal life.

== Signs and symptoms ==
People living with carcinophobia frequently have depression. Sufferers may become reclusive and obsessive over their health. They may feel overwhelmed and fail to carry out their usual functions. The fear is associated with a lack of future planning and an overall poor quality of life.

== Causes ==
Anxieties surrounding cancer are exacerbated by fears of its unpredictability and perceived “indestructibility” as well as associated fears of mortality.

Cancer survivors are also susceptible to developing a debilitating fear of recurrence due to their previous experience with the disease. Half of all cancer survivors report a moderate to high fear of recurrence.

Cancer phobia can also appear in people suffering from hypochondria. PTSD is also a common cause of the phobia.

Several factors can heighten the risk of developing anxiety related to cancer. People may be more susceptible to anxiety if they have undergone certain experiences such as:

- Having been previously affected by cancer.
- Seeing a loved one develop cancer.
- A loved one dying from cancer.

== Treatment ==
Psychotherapeutic approaches such as Cognitive behavioral therapy (CBT) are recommended as effective interventions for managing anxiety in cancer patients. CBT is used for a wide variety of fears and phobias, including carcinophobia. It helps patients to increase awareness of their disorder and provides ways for patients to cope with their emotions. Mind-body techniques are also designed to alleviate anxiety and help manage fears and phobias, including the fear associated with cancer. Relaxation skills aim to relieve fears, stress, and bodily tension. Relaxation skills include progressive muscle relaxation, guided imagery, and diaphragmatic breathing. Meditation techniques include journaling, meditative movement, yoga practices, tai chi, and mindful dance. Research shows relaxation skills and meditation techniques have small to significant effects on managing anxiety due to cancer.
