= International Headache Society =

Organization focused on headache research and treatment

The International Headache Society (IHS) is a London-based charity membership organisation that was founded in 1981 for those with a professional commitment to helping people affected by headache disorders and facial pains. In 1994, the IHS was incorporated in England and Wales as a Company Limited by Guarantee and then registered as a charity in 1995. The current President is Professor Cristina Tassorelli, who is a full professor and Chair of Neurology, Director of the Neurology Residency Program and Director of the Department of Brain and Behavioral Sciences at the University of Pavia.

The IHS currently has about 1,000 ordinary members and 1,000 associated members. The official journal of the IHS is Cephalalgia, which is a peer-reviewed medical journal that focuses on research into headache disorders.

== International Headache Congress ==
The International Headache Congress (IHC) is a biennial event that is organized by the IHS and hosted by a national member society.
