= Jaydev Panchwagh =

Jaydev Panchwagh is an Indian neurosurgeon from Pune, Maharashtra. He is specialized in microvascular decompression and treatment of complex neurological conditions. He has been involved in clinical work and interdisciplinary engagement with visual representations of neurosurgical imagery.

== Career ==
Panchwagh is known to practice neurosurgery in Pune, where his clinical expertise encompasses procedures such as microvascular decompression (MVD), a surgical technique for cranial nerve compression disorders including trigeminal neuralgia.

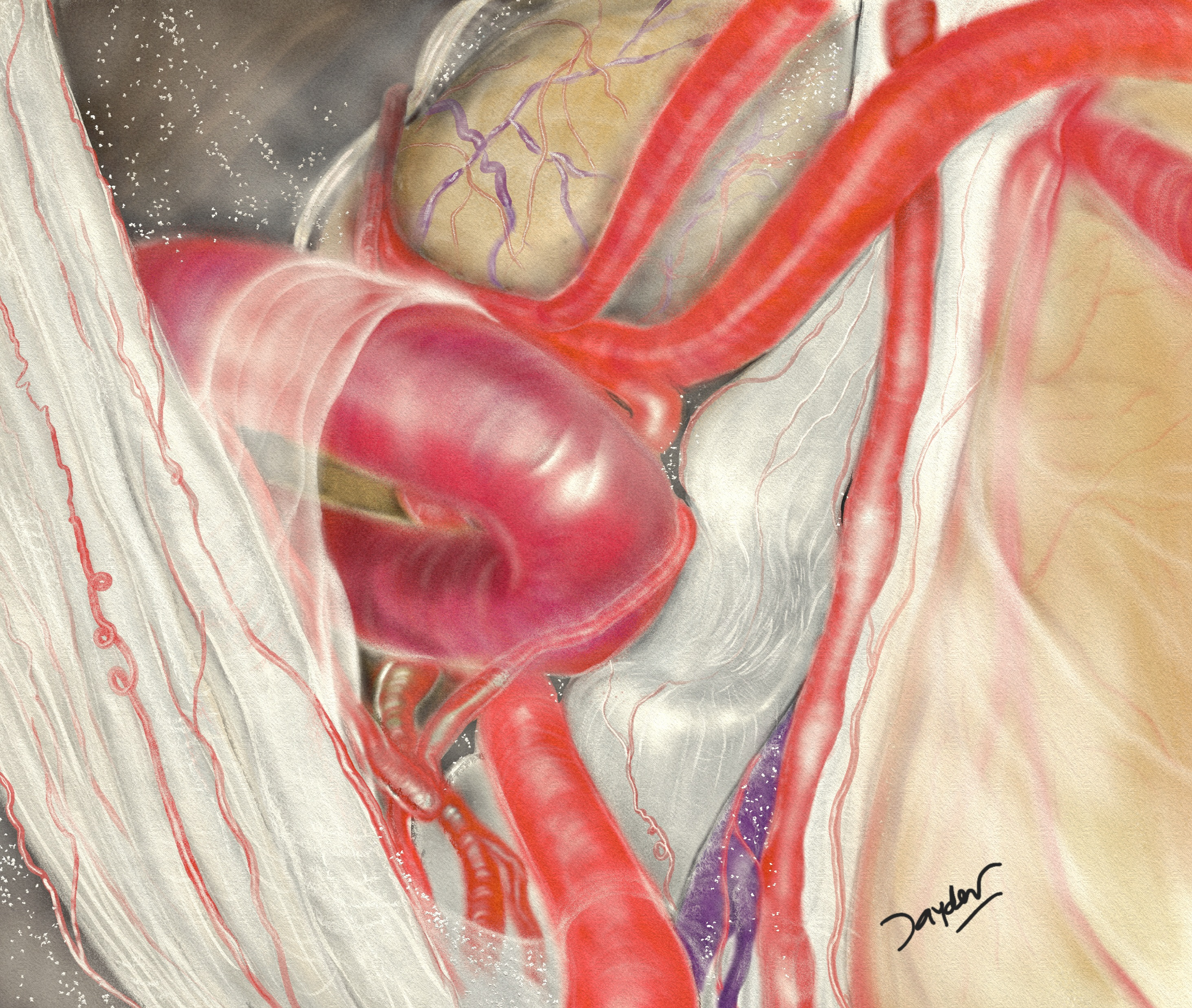
The endoscopic view of the Brainstem during a critical Microvascular Decompression Surgery.

In addition to clinical work, he has provided explanation of trigeminal neuralgia (“suicide disease”) in interviews conducted for health journalism pieces.

A feature titled “Scalpel, Stylus & Soul: Exploring a Neurosurgeon’s Fine Art of the Brain” examined his paintings derived from intraoperative views of neuroanatomy and discussed the relationship between his clinical practice and visual interpretation of the brain. A unique concept of the "Neurosurgical Art focused on mainly the aesthetic Aspect" has evolved into a project called as the 'Cerebral Canvas'. The concept of turning neurosurgical endoscopic and microscopic visuals into pieces of aesthetically enchanting paintings has generated the art movement of Cerebral Canvas for the last 4 years at Pune, India. Earlier, he was featured discussing trigeminal neuralgia and its treatment approaches, including surgical intervention.
