= Peter J. Jannetta =

American neurosurgeon (1932–2016)

Peter Joseph Jannetta
- Born: April 5, 1932; Philadelphia, Pennsylvania, United States
- Died: April 11, 2016 (aged 84)
- Education: University of Pennsylvania; University of California
- Known for: Microvascular decompression
- Medical career
- Profession: Surgeon
- Sub-specialties: Neurosurgery

Peter Joseph Jannetta (April 5, 1932 – April 11, 2016) was an American neurosurgeon known for devising microvascular decompression, a surgical procedure to treat trigeminal neuralgia. At the University of Pittsburgh School of Medicine, he was the first Walter Dandy Professor of Neurological Surgery.

== Biography ==
Born in Philadelphia, Jannetta graduated from the University of Pennsylvania with an undergraduate degree and a medical degree. He stayed at Penn for training as a general surgeon, then completed a National Institutes of Health fellowship in neurophysiology before training as a neurosurgeon at the University of California, Los Angeles.

During his residency at UCLA, Jannetta was in the laboratory dissecting a set of cranial nerves when he noticed that a blood vessel was unexpectedly pressing on one of the nerves. Jannetta suspected that this abnormal impingement of the nerve might be the cause of the painful facial condition known as trigeminal neuralgia. He devised the microvascular decompression procedure to treat patients with the condition. In addition to helping trigeminal neuralgia patients, the procedure became a treatment option for several related conditions.

He was a faculty member and division chief at Louisiana State University before moving to a similar role with the University of Pittsburgh in 1971. In 1995, he spent a year as Secretary of Health for the Commonwealth of Pennsylvania. Jannetta practiced at Allegheny General Hospital for a few years before he retired.

Jannetta received a Horatio Alger Award in 1990. The Karolinska Institute honored him with the Herbert Olivecrona Award in 1983. He was married twice, first to history professor Ann Bowman Jannetta, then to art critic Diana Rose Jannetta. He is survived by his six children: Susan, Joanne, Carol, Peter, Elizabeth, and Michael.

Dr. Jannetta served as the Secretary of Health for the state of Pennsylvania during the term of Governor Tom Ridge from 1995 to 1996.

== Death ==
Jannetta suffered a head injury after a fall in his home in Pittsburgh and died on April 11, 2016, six days after his 84th birthday.
