= Postencephalitic =

Postencephalitic may refer to:

- Postencephalitic parkinsonism
- Postencephalitic trophic ulcer
