= Lambeth slavery case =

Modern day slavery case

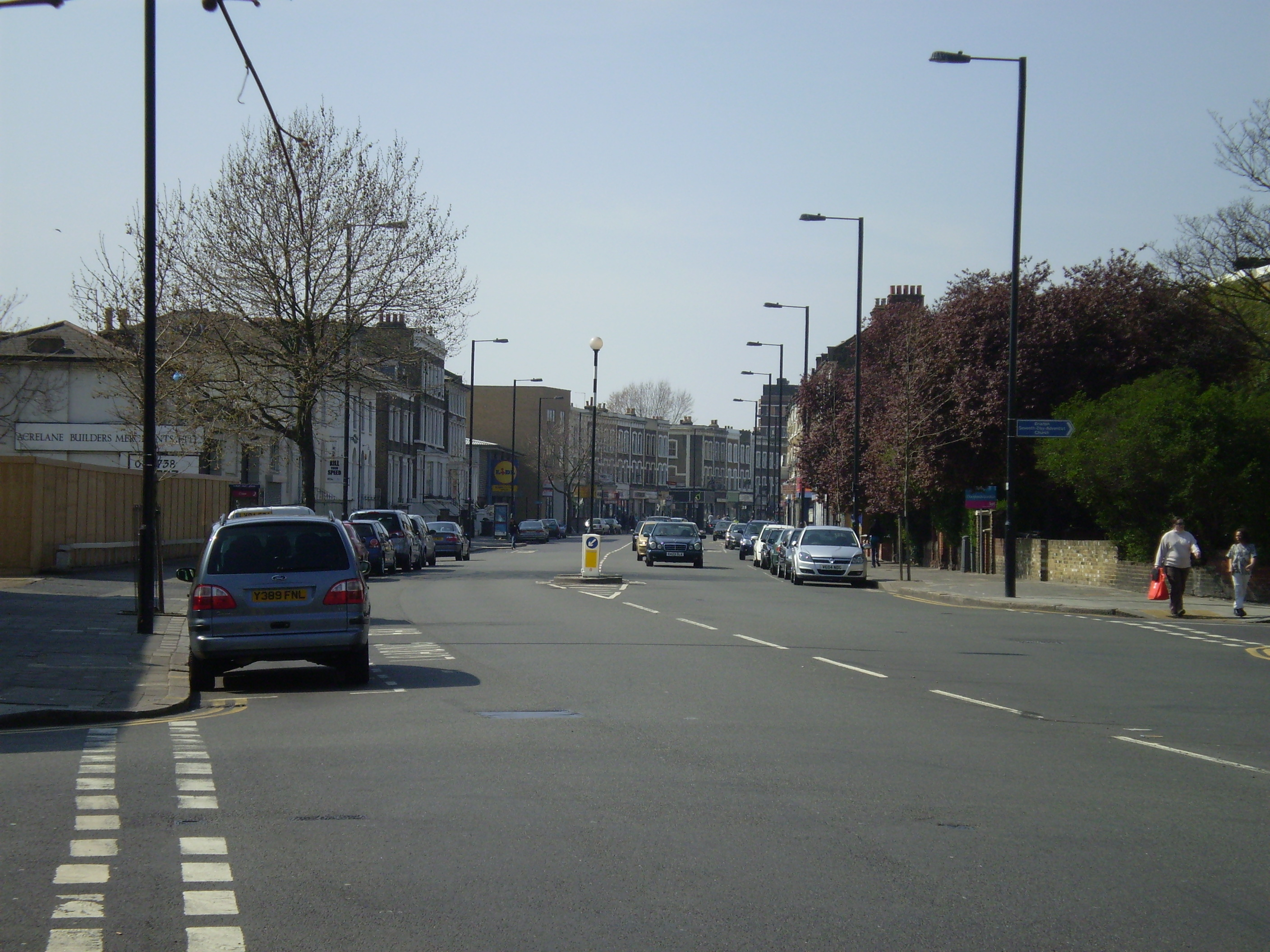
- WIMLM, centre, 2007
- Location: 140 Acre Lane, Lambeth, South London, England
- Date: 1980s – 21 November 2013
- Attack type: Slavery, domestic servitude
- Victims: Aishah Wahab; Josephine Herivel; Rosie Morgan-Davies

On 21 November 2013, Metropolitan Police from South London's Human Trafficking Unit arrested two suspects at a residential address in Lambeth. A 73-year-old ethnic Indian Singaporean man, Aravindan Balakrishnan, and a 67-year-old Tanzanian woman, his wife, Chanda Pattni, had been investigated for slavery and domestic servitude. The case centred around the Workers' Institute of Marxism–Leninism–Mao Zedong Thought commune which was led by Balakrishnan. In the early 1980s after a police raid, Balakrishnan decided to move the group's activities underground. Balakrishnan's control over his followers intensified and the commune became a prison to his followers. On 25 October 2013, three women were rescued from the commune: a 69-year-old Malaysian woman (later revealed to be Aishah Wahab), a 57-year-old Northern Irish woman (Josephine Herivel) and a 30-year-old London woman (Katy Morgan-Davies). Morgan-Davies was born into the sect and had not experienced the outside world until her release.

== Perpetrator ==
Aravindan Balakrishnan (known to his followers as "Comrade Bala") was born in Kerala, India, and migrated at the age of ten to Singapore, Malaya, where his father was a soldier. Balakrishnan was a student at Raffles Institution and later the University of Singapore, where although gaining a reputation as a "quiet chap", he became increasingly politically active and believed that he would have been imprisoned in Singapore had he openly admitted to being a communist. In 1977, while living in London, his Singaporean citizenship—which he gained in 1960—was revoked due to his leadership of the Workers' Institute of Marxism–Leninism–Mao Zedong Thought, which the Ministry of Home Affairs accused of engaging in "activities which are prejudicial to the security" of Singapore, and denounced him as a radical "closely associated with Eurocommunists". The authorities claimed that Balakrishnan and others, many of them former Singaporean students he had associated with in London, were plotting to overthrow Singapore's leader, Lee Kuan Yew.

Despite believing the United Kingdom to be a fascist state due to its treatment of the people of Singapore during the Malayan Emergency, Balakrishnan emigrated to the UK in 1963 on a British Council scholarship to study at the London School of Economics, and married his wife Chanda in 1971. Over the years he built up a following by giving lectures and staging various sit-ins and protests. He was a regular attendee at London demonstrations, where he waved banners depicting the Chinese leader Mao Zedong and addressed the crowds.

In 1974, Balakrishnan and his "small clique" were expelled from the Communist Party of England (Marxist–Leninist) on account of "their pursuance of conspiratorial and splittist activities ... spreading social fascist slanders against the Party and the proletarian movement" and attempting "to put themselves above the discipline of the Party". The CPE(M–L) "repudiated the metaphysical logic harmfully promoted" by Balakrishnan in "opposition to dialectical materialism and the concrete analysis of concrete conditions". In response, Balakrishnan set up the Workers' Institute and launched his own publication, the South London Workers' Bulletin, which accused the CPE(M–L) of being "fascists" and "agents of imperialism".

Between 1974 and 1976, his followers attempted to "build revolutionary stable base areas in working-class communities", primarily South London, and worked in ordinary jobs. Balakrishnan discouraged his followers from joining trade unions, describing them as agents of the "imperialist fascist bourgeoisie".

Eventually, after the more liberal members of his group drifted away, a cult of around 10 female members formed around him. The collective moved to Brixton in 1976, under the title Workers Institute of Marxism-Leninism-Mao Zedong Thought. Following Mao's death in 1976, the Institute built the Mao Zedong Memorial Centre at 140 Acre Lane, Brixton, which also functioned as a communist collective of "thirteen comrades", with "13 members living on the premises, half in paid work, six doing full-time revolutionary work, with a strong emphasis on women taking a leading role (apart from leading the Party Committee headed by Bala)". Members were handed a rota of chores and only allowed to go out in pairs, which Balakrishnan claimed was because the area they lived in was "notorious for violence" and "anything could happen".

Following a police raid on the Memorial Centre in March 1978, which the group claimed involved "over 200 police", including officers from the Special Patrol Group, "under the pretext of searching for drugs", the Workers' Institute effectively went underground, with the remaining members being convinced to end all contact with others and maintain an intense level of secrecy. Family members were later branded fascist agents and ostracised, and Balakrishnan and his captives moved to a number of properties during this time as a means for him to escape detection from the authorities. Balakrishnan convinced his followers that everything was controlled by him from the sun, the moon, wind and fires; that he could overthrow governments, control natural disasters, and make people live or die. In order to progress his cause, Balakrishnan invented "JACKIE" (an acronym for Jehovah, Allah, Christ, Krishna and Immortal Easwaran) – a type of dangerous, mystical machine that monitored all thought and could control minds.

Balakrishnan began sexually abusing two of the women in 1979, often physically beating them and making others watch as he did so. All of the women were beaten and four (not including his wife) were said to have been sexually assaulted by or engaged in sexual relations with him. Balakrishnan forced the women to swallow his ejaculate as it was "the elixir of life", and claimed the women he sexually abused had been trying to seduce him out of "jealousy" for his lover.

== Victims ==
- Katy Morgan-Davies – born in 1983, she was originally named Prem Maopinduzi Davies. She began calling herself "Rosie" in her teens. She has subsequently changed her name to Katy Morgan-Davies, after the American singer Katy Perry. She is the biological daughter of Balakrishnan and Sian Davies, although she was told that she had no biological relatives and grew up not knowing the true identity of her parents for definite until she left the collective. Morgan-Davies was brought up entirely isolated from the outside world and never went to a nursery, school, dentist or doctor. She was not told who her parents were. The commune members taught her to read and write.
- Sian Davies – in the early 1980s, after joining the commune, she had a sexual relationship with Balakrishnan. On Christmas Eve 1996, Morgan-Davies remembered seeing Davies bound and gagged on the living room for trying to escape. Later, she fell out of a top floor bathroom window and was taken to hospital. In hospital she suffered a rapid decline in her mental health and fell into a coma. She died eight months later. After the fall, her family were told she had gone to India. At the time of Davies' death, her daughter Morgan-Davies, did not know she was her mother.
- Aishah Wahab – a Malaysian woman who moved to the United Kingdom at the age of 24 to study, joining the group shortly after. Aishah was reportedly so drawn in by Balakrishnan's Marxist rhetoric that she left her fiancé and moved in with the collective.
- Oh Kar Eng – nurse from Malaysia who had followed Balakrishnan from the 1970s. She hit her head on a cupboard in 2001 and suffered a stroke. No medical treatment was allowed by the commune and she died the next day. The police were not informed of the accident. Her family were not told about her cremation, and they were told the commune did not have her ashes when in fact they were in storage in London.
- Josephine Herivel – known as Josie, was a violinist studying at the Royal College of Music before she joined the group. Her father, John Herivel was one of the Bletchley Park codebreakers who helped Britain and its allies win World War II. She is believed to have moved to London in the 1970s and disowned her family after becoming involved with the Workers' Institute of Marxism–Leninism–Mao Zedong Thought, and is speculated to have been disowned by her father. Herivel initiated the escape plan after becoming concerned with Morgan-Davies' rapid weight loss (which was due to undiagnosed diabetes). Medical treatment was not permitted by the commune. Herivel secretly phoned a helpline after memorizing the number from a television programme. Herivel has denounced the Balakrishnan sentencing, claiming he has been framed by the state.

== Imprisonment and rescue ==
The two older victims are believed to have met Balakrishnan in London through, according to police, a shared political ideology, as he was the leader of the Workers' Institute of Marxism–Leninism–Mao Zedong Thought. The women were not being physically restrained, but held by "invisible handcuffs" after being subjected to brainwashing, emotional abuse and physical abuse by their captors. The three women, who are not related, are said to have been held captive for more than 30 years with the youngest of the three thought to have spent her whole life in servitude.

The police were tipped off by Freedom Charity who contacted police following a phone call they had received on 18 October, during which a woman stated that she'd been held unwillingly for more than 30 years. Aneeta Prem of Freedom Charity confirmed that the Irish woman made contact with the charity after watching the ITV television documentary Forced to Marry about forced marriage in the United Kingdom. The women, who are said to be "highly traumatised", are now in safe accommodation.

The two suspects were bailed until April 2014, and were unable to return to the three-bedroom flat they rented from a housing association.

On 11 December 2014, it emerged that Balakrishnan had been charged with offences relating to cruelty to a person under 16, four counts of rape and 17 counts of indecent assault. Balakrishnan appeared before Westminster magistrates on 17 December 2014. His wife, Chanda Pattni, was released earlier in 2014, as there was considered to be insufficient evidence for a realistic prospect of conviction.

Balakrishnan's trial started on 11 November 2015. During his trial, he acted as the only defence witness, and told jurors that a challenge to his leadership resulted in the 1986 Space Shuttle Challenger disaster, and that JACKIE was responsible for the death of a Malaysian prime minister and the election of Jeremy Corbyn as Leader of the Labour Party.

On 4 December 2015, Balakrishnan was convicted of child cruelty, false imprisonment, four counts of rape, six counts of indecent assault and two counts of assault. On 29 January 2016, Balakrishnan was sentenced to 23 years. On 8 April 2022, he died in prison. In 2024, the coroner stated that Balakrishnan died of natural causes.

== Bibliography ==
- Morgan-Davies, Katy (3 May 2018). Caged Bird. Random House. ISBN 978-1-4735-5365-1.
  - Morgan-Davies, Katy (1 February 2019). The Girl in the Shadows: My Life in a Cult. Random House. ISBN 978-1-4735-6686-6.
