= Anesthesia dolorosa =

Pain felt in an area numb to touch

Anesthesia dolorosa or anaesthesia dolorosa or deafferentation pain is pain felt in an area (usually of the face) which is completely numb to touch. The pain is described as constant, burning, aching or severe. It can be a side effect of surgery involving any part of the trigeminal system, and occurs after 1–4% of peripheral surgery for trigeminal neuralgia. No effective medical therapy has yet been found. Several surgical techniques have been tried, with modest or mixed results. The value of surgical interventions is difficult to assess because published studies involve small numbers of mixed patient types and little long term follow-up.

- Gasserian ganglion stimulation is stimulation of the gasserian ganglion with electric pulses from a small generator implanted beneath the skin. There are mixed reports, including some reports of marked, some of moderate and some of no improvement. Further studies of more patients with longer follow-up are required to determine the efficacy of this treatment.
- Deep brain stimulation was found in one review to produce good results in forty-five percent of 106 cases. Though relief may not be permanent, several years of relief may be achieved with this technique.
- Mesencephalotomy is the damaging of the junction of the trigeminal tract and the periaqueductal gray in the brain, and has produced pain relief in a group of patients with cancer pain; but when applied to six anesthesia dolorosa patients, no pain relief was achieved, and the unpleasant sensation was in fact increased.
- Dorsal root entry zone lesioning, damaging the point where sensory nerve fibers meet spinal cord fibers, produced favorable results in some patients and poor results in others, with incidence of ataxia at 40%. Patient numbers were small, follow-up was short and existing evidence does not indicate long term efficacy.
- One surgeon treated thirty-five patients using trigeminal nucleotomy, damaging the nucleus caudalis, and reported 66% "abolition of allodynia and a marked reduction in or (less frequently) complete abolition of deep background pain."
