= Postencephalitic trophic ulcer =

Medical condition of the nose

Postencephalitic trophic ulcer is an ulceration of the nose similar to trigeminal trophic lesions, and has been reported following epidemic encephalitis and herpes zoster of the trigeminal nerve.

== See also ==
- List of cutaneous conditions
