= Hemifacial spasm =

Neurologic disorder

Hemifacial spasm (HFS) is a rare neuromuscular disease characterized by irregular, involuntary muscle contractions (spasms) on one side (hemi-) of the face (-facial). The facial muscles are controlled by the facial nerve (seventh cranial nerve), which originates at the brainstem and exits the skull below the ear where it separates into five main branches.

This disease takes two forms: typical and atypical. In typical form, the twitching usually starts in the lower eyelid in orbicularis oculi muscle. As time progresses, it spreads to the whole lid, then to the orbicularis oris muscle around the lips, and buccinator muscle in the cheekbone area. The reverse process of twitching occurs in atypical hemifacial spasm; twitching starts in orbicularis oris muscle around the lips, and buccinator muscle in the cheekbone area in the lower face, then progresses up to the orbicularis oculi muscle in the eyelid as time progresses. The most common form is the typical form, and atypical form is only seen in about 2–3% of patients with hemifacial spasm. The incidence of hemifacial spasm is approximately 0.8 per 100,000 persons.

This disorder occurs in both men and women, although it affects middle-aged or elderly women more frequently. Hemifacial spasm is much more common in some Asian populations. It may be caused by a facial nerve injury, compression by a blood vessel, a tumor, or it may have no apparent cause. Individuals with spasm on both sides of the face are very rare.

== Signs and symptoms ==
The first sign of hemifacial spasm is typically muscle movement in the patient's eyelid and around the eye. It can vary in intensity. The intermittent twitching of the eyelid, which can result in forced closure of the eye which gradually spreads to the muscles of the lower part of the face (Typical form- See Image). In atypical form the spasms start in the cheekbone area and spreads to the eyelid. Ultimately, all the muscles on that side are affected, nearly all the time. This sometimes causes the mouth to be pulled to the side. Experts have linked hemifacial spasm to facial nerve injury, Bell's palsy and tumors. Although the most frequent cause is a blood vessel pressing on the facial nerve at the spot where it leaves the patient's brain stem, sometimes there is no known cause. When the affected individual is younger than 40, doctors suspect an underlying cause such as multiple sclerosis.

== Causes ==
The Facial Nerve (The Seventh Cranial Nerve)

Three theories exist to explain the facial nerve dysfunction found in hemifacial spasm. The first proposed theory is ephaptic transmission, which is electrical activity crossing from one demyelinated neuron to another resulting in a false synapse. The second theory involves abnormal activity of axons at the facial nerve root end zone secondary to compressive damage/demyelination.

The third theory or "Kindling theory" involves increased excitability of the facial nerve nucleus due to feedback from a damaged facial nerve.

It is generally accepted as compression of the facial nerve by vessels of the posterior circulation. In detail compression of the seventh cranial nerve by a dolichoectatic (a distorted, dilated, and elongated) anterior inferior cerebellar artery, or posterior inferior cerebellar artery is accepted to be the general cause of hemifacial spasm. Less than 1% of cases are caused by tumor. Hemifacial spasm is much more common in some Asian populations.

Several families with hemifacial spasm have been reported, suggesting a genetic etiology or predisposition in some cases. There appears to be an autosomal dominant pattern of inheritance in these families with low penetrance, and except for a younger age at onset, the clinical features overlap with the idiopathic cases. Evaluation of single-nucleotide polymorphisms in genes related to vascular change causing compression of blood vessels did not show an association with hemifacial spasm. Clarifying the role of genetic susceptibility in hemifacial spasm may help to better understand the pathogenesis of this disease.

== Diagnosis ==
There are several tests available to diagnose a case of hemifacial spasm. Diagnosis begins with a complete neurological exam, including an electromyography (EMG: a test that measures and records electrical activity generated in muscle at rest and in response to muscle contraction), magnetic resonance imaging (MRI: a test that uses magnetic waves to make pictures of structures inside the head), computed tomography (CT scan: a type of x-ray that uses a computer to make pictures of structures inside the head), and angiography (an x-ray exam of the blood vessels when they are filled with a contrast material).

Studies have shown that the most effective method of hemifacial spasm screening is MRI. In one study, only 25% of the CT scans showed the abnormality in hemifacial spasm patients, whilst more than half of the MRI imaging demonstrated a vascular anomaly. MRI imaging is recommended as the initial screening procedure in the assessment of patients with hemifacial spasm.

== Prevention ==
There is no known way to prevent hemifacial spasm.

== Treatments ==
Mild cases of hemifacial spasm may be managed with sedation or carbamazepine (an anticonvulsant drug). Microsurgical decompression and botulinum toxin injections are the current main treatments used for hemifacial spasm.

=== Microvascular decompression ===
Endoscope-assisted microvascular decompression in hemifacial spasm with a teflon bridge. Source: Rhomberg, T., Eördögh, M., Lehmann, S. et al. Endoscope-assisted microvascular decompression in hemifacial spasm with a teflon bridge. Acta Neurochir 166, 239 (2024). https://doi.org/10.1007/s00701-024-06142-7

Microvascular decompression appears to be the most popular surgical treatment at present. Microvascular decompression relieves pressure on the facial nerve, which is the cause of most hemifacial spasm cases. Excellent to good results are reported in 80% or more cases with a 10% recurrence rate. In the present series approximately 10% had previously failed surgery. Serious complications can follow microsurgical decompressive operations, even when performed by experienced surgeons. These include cerebellar haematoma or swelling, brainstem infarction (blood vessel of the brain stem blocked), cerebral infarction (ischemic stroke resulting from a disturbance in the blood vessels supplying blood to the brain), subdural haematoma and intracerebral infarction (blockage of blood flow to the brain). Death or permanent disability (hearing loss) can occur in 2% of patients of hemifacial spasm.

=== Botulinum toxin ===
Observational data from studies (the updated review in 2020 did not find any randomized controlled trials) indicates that botulinum toxin is safe and effective in the treatment of hemifacial spasm with success rates of between 76 and 100%. The injections are administered as an outpatient or office procedure. Although side effects do occur, these are never permanent. Repeated injections over the years remain highly effective. Whilst the toxin is expensive, the cost of even prolonged courses of injections compares favourably with the cost of surgery. Patients with HFS should be offered a number of treatment options. Sometimes as a temporary measure, medical treatment can be offered to patients with very mild cases or those who are reluctant to have surgery or botulinum toxin injections. In young and fit patients, microsurgical decompression and botulinum injections should be discussed as alternative procedures. In the majority of cases, and especially in the elderly and the unfit, botulinum toxin injection is the treatment of first choice. Imaging procedures should be done in all unusual cases of hemifacial spasm and when surgery is contemplated.

Patients with hemifacial spasm were shown to have decreased sweating after botulinum toxin injections. This was first observed in 1993 by Khalaf Bushara and David Park in the first demonstration of nonmuscular use of BTX-A. Bushara further showed the efficacy of botulinum toxin in treating hyperhidrosis (excessive sweating). BTX-A was later approved for the treatment of excessive underarm sweating. This is technically known as severe primary axillary hyperhidrosis – excessive underarm sweating with an unknown cause which cannot be managed by topical agents (see focal hyperhidrosis).

== Epidemiology ==
The incidence of hemifacial spasm is approximately 0.8 per 100,000 persons. Hemifacial spasm is more prevalent among females over 40 years of age. The estimated prevalence for women is 14.5 per 100,000 and 7.4 per 100,000 in men. Prevalence for hemifacial spasm increases with age, reaching 39.7 per 100,000 for those aged 70 years and older. One study divided 214 hemifacial patients based on the cause of the disease: primary hemifacial spasm, where the patients had a compression in the facial nerve at the end of the brainstem; and secondary hemifacial spasm, where the patients had peripheral facial palsy or nerve lesion due to tumors, demyelination, trauma or infection. The study found that 77% of cases were primary and 23% secondary. The study also found that the two sets of patients shared a similar age at onset, male to female ratios, and similar affected side. In another study of 2050 patients who had presented with hemifacial spasm between 1986 and 2009, only nine cases were caused by a cerebellopontine angle syndrome, an incidence of 0.44%.

== History ==
The earliest descriptions about hemifacial spasm is by Shultze in 1875 and Gowers in 1899. The etiology of hemifacial spasm and location of the abnormality have been debated for more than a century. Surgical treatment for hemifacial spasm in the early 20th century included neurolysis (destruction of nerve tissue), stretching the facial nerve (seventh cranial nerve), and high-pressure irrigation of the nerve with lactate ringer's solution. The medical regimens of that time involved injection of the nerve with ethanol, electrical stimulation, application of toxic compounds (nitrate of silver, zinc, arsenic, bromides) as well as medications such as Dilantin or other anticonvulsants.

Additional advances in understanding the etiology and improving treatments for hemifacial spasm did not occur until the mid-seventies. In 1977, 47 cases of hemifacial spasm underwent microvascular decompression of the facial nerve using the operating microscope. The results illustrated nerve-vessel conflicts (or cholesteatoma) to be located at the root exit zone of the facial nerve in all cases. The root exit zone is where the central glial axonal insulation of the nerve ends and the peripheral nerve axonal myelination begins, this is known as The Obersteiner-Redlich zone. Biopsies of the root exit zone demonstrated degeneration of axons, denuded axis cylinder and interrupted myelin. The results of the experiment strengthened the theory that vascular compression of the facial nerve was the primary cause of hemifacial spasm, and proposed a specific region of the facial nerve where the effects of longstanding compression results in nerve dysfunction.
