= Workers' Institute of Marxism–Leninism–Mao Zedong Thought =

1974–2013 British political organisation

- General Secretary: Aravindan Balakrishnan
- Founded: 1974
- Dissolved: 2013
- Split from: Communist Party of England (Marxist-Leninist)
- Succeeded by: Workers' Institute for Advanced Theoretical Studies of Nature
- Headquarters: Acre Lane, Brixton
- Membership (1988): 8
- Ideology: Communism; Marxism–Leninism; Mao Zedong Thought; JACKIE
- Political position: Far-left

The Workers' Institute of Marxism–Leninism–Mao Zedong Thought was a British political organisation based in Brixton, London. It was formed by Aravindan Balakrishnan in 1974 after his expulsion from the Communist Party of England (Marxist–Leninist). Many of its members lived in a commune originally located at its headquarters. In the early 1980s, after a police raid, Balakrishnan decided to move the group's activities underground.

Balakrishnan's control over his followers intensified and the commune moved between several addresses. The group ended in 2013 with the arrest of Balakrishnan and his wife, Chandra, under the suspicion of multiple charges including rape, false imprisonment, and domestic abuse. The three remaining members were taken to safety, including Katy Morgan-Davies who was born into the sect.

== History ==
The Workers' Institute of Marxism–Leninism-Mao Tsetung Thought was formed by Aravindan Balakrishnan in 1974 after his expulsion from the Communist Party of England (Marxist–Leninist). The Workers' Institute began publishing the South London Workers' Bulletin from a south London squat, aiming to build a "red base" in Brixton and encourage the Chinese People's Liberation Army (PLA) to liberate the area.

Their headquarters in Acre Lane, Brixton, known as the Mao Zedong Memorial Centre, opened in October 1976. The centre was a commune which housed thirteen people. Other members lived nearby in co-housing. Members were expected to give a share of their earning to the group.

The group came to broader attention when the diarist in The Times in April 1977 reported some of the group's material as an amusing aside. The Workers' Institute claimed affiliation to the Chinese Communist Party. A document by the group issued in 1977 argued that the British population was moving in a "revolutionary direction". The document asserted that the opening of the group's headquarters "has taken the British fascist state by storm". Balakrishnan prophesied that the PLA would launch a revolutionary invasion of the United Kingdom by 1980.

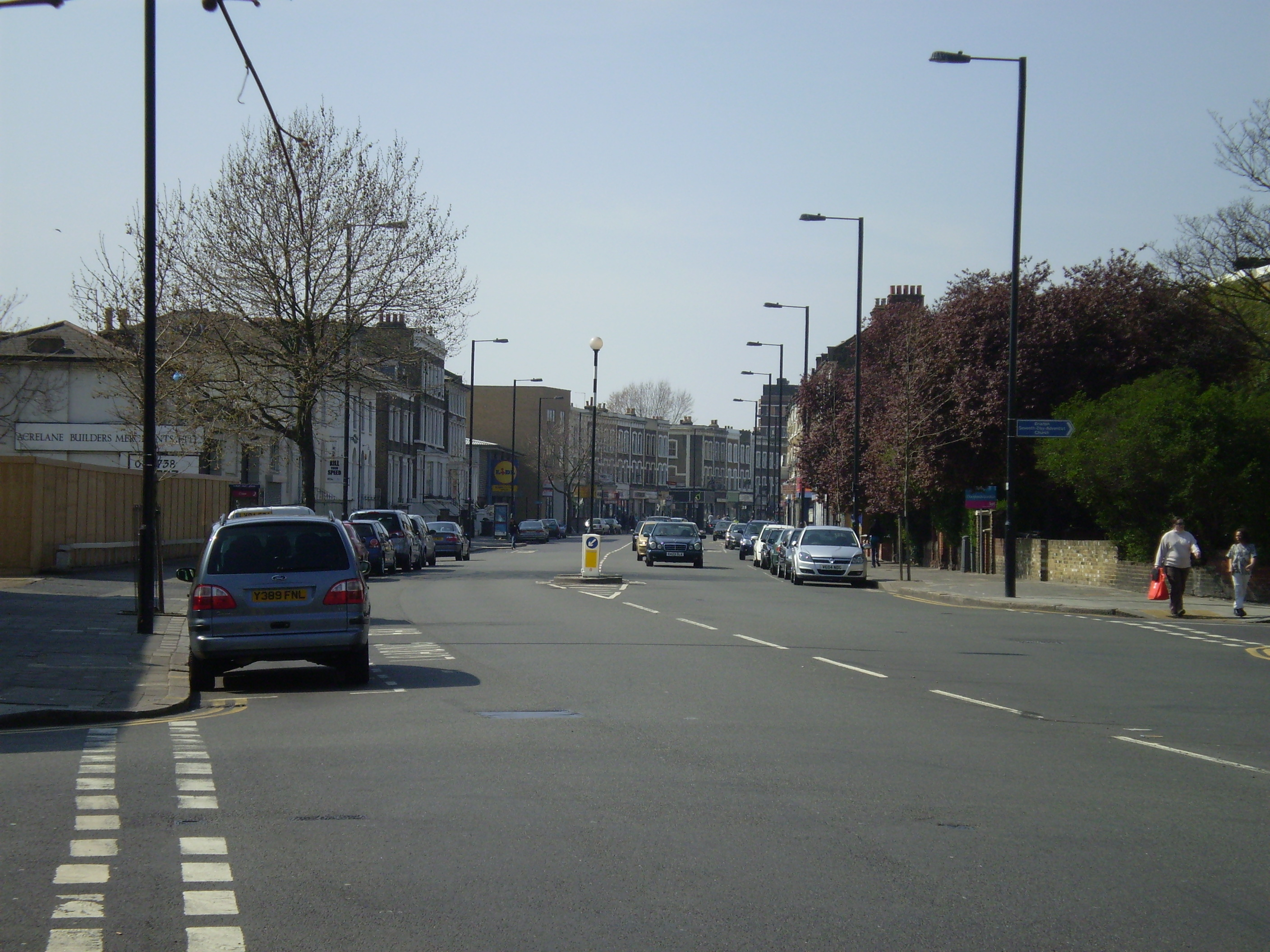
Headquarters in centre of image, 140 Acre Lane

The headquarters was monitored by the police. In March 1978, it was raided under suspicion of drug offences. No drugs were found but at least nine were arrested for assaulting police officers, including Balakrishnan. The centre was closed down after the raid. At the trial those charged refused to accept the authority of the court and they were sent to jail for a brief period.

After his release Balakrishnan decided to take the group's activities underground. In 1980, the group consisted of Balakrishnan and seven female followers.

The group lived together at various locations around south London. The group house was visited in 1997 by a news organisation seeking an interview which was refused.

=== Arrest and charges ===
In 2013, the arrest of Balakrishnan and wife Chandra for suspicion of enslavement and domestic abuse marked the end of the group. The trial has become known as the Lambeth slavery case. After the arrest the three remaining women, Katy Morgan-Davies (Balakrishnan's daughter), Aisha Wahab and Josie Herivel were taken to safety.

Balakrishnan was charged with several offences on 11 December 2014. No further legal action is to be taken against his wife. The hearings for the case began in November 2015. On 4 December 2015 he was found guilty of a string of sex assaults (including rape), child cruelty and false imprisonment. Balakrishnan was sentenced to 23 years in prison by the Southwark crown court on 29 January 2016. He died in Brixton Prison on 8 April 2022.

== Ideology ==
The Workers' Institute of Marxism–Leninism–Mao Zedong Thought has been described as a "Maoist cult". Splitting from the Communist Party of England (Marxist-Leninist) in 1974, Balakrishnan argued that he did so become his former comrades "had turned their backs on the great glorious, and correct Communist Party of China in favour of the international fascist bourgeoisie." The group's stated aim was "upholding the authority of the Communist party of China and Chairman Mao as the leaders of the world revolution"; it worked to establish a "stable revolutionary base in and around Brixton", stating that it selected Brixton "because it is the worst place in the world". The group tolerated no cooperation with any other part of the British left, nor trade unions, considering them "organs of fascism".

Scholar Julia Lovell described the group as the "extreme millenarian fringe" of Western Maoism. So extreme was their veneration for Mao that Balakrishnan and his supporters argued that Mao had achieved a form of a scientific-occult mastery over the world, developing electronic weapons (called "Jackie" by the group) which would have prevented enemy nuclear missiles from taking off, and which could remotely sabotage American press conferences. Balakrishnan claimed that Mao had "zapped him with a death ray from a London taxi meter". Similarly to other Maoist groups, the Workers' Institute of Marxism–Leninism–Mao Zedong Thought specifically appealed to and venerated ethnic minorities within majority-white societies; over two-thirds of the group were non-European, mostly Asian, women.

== Criticism ==
Steve Rayner in his 1979 paper The Classification and Dynamics of Sectarian Forms of Organisation found the group to be millenarian and incapable of critical debate, noting that "disagreement is not merely driven underground but actually goes unrecognised in the interests of group solidarity and an extreme ideology of equality."

Robert Griffiths, general secretary of the Communist Party of Britain, said of the group in November 2013: "if one were to be brutally honest they were more of psychiatric interest than political interest. They had nothing to do with the mainstream left-wing and communist politics of the day."

== Organisation ==
In 1979, Steve Rayner claimed the group practised democratic centralism.

== Bibliography ==
- Morgan-Davies, Katy (3 May 2018). Caged Bird. Random House. ISBN 978-1-4735-5365-1.
  - Morgan-Davies, Katy (1 February 2019). The Girl in the Shadows: My Life in a Cult. Random House. ISBN 978-1-4735-6686-6.
- Peter Barberis, John McHugh and Mike Tyldesley, Encyclopedia of British and Irish Political Organizations, Pinter, 2000, ISBN 1855672642 p. 169.
- Rayner, Stephen Frank (1979). The Classification and Dynamics of Sectarian Forms of Organisation: Grid/Group Perspectives on the Far-Left in Britain (PDF) (Thesis). University College London.

== See also ==
- Religious communism
- Democratic Workers Party
- Revolutionary Communist Party, USA
- Workers' Cause Party
- Peoples Temple
- Lord's Resistance Army
- Symbionese Liberation Army
