= Aneeta Prem =

British woman activist

Aneeta Prem MBE JP

Personal details
- Born: London
- Occupation: Magistrate; President of Freedom Charity
- Website: www.freedomcharity.org.uk www.aneeta.com

Aneeta Prem is a British author, human rights campaigner, magistrate and the founder and president of Freedom.

== Background ==
Prem was born in London, England. Her father, Chandra Shekhar Prem, was an author, poet and principal of a girls' college in India. Her family originates from Himachal Pradesh in Northern India. Prem has close ties with Kote Village, where her father lived. In 2000 she helped her father to realise his dream of allowing local girls to continue with their education beyond the age of sixteen. She helped to design and build Republic College India which provides further education in a safe, single-sex environment, offering a unique service to the area.

== Work as a magistrate ==
Prem is a magistrate who chairs adult, youth and family law courts in some of the busiest courts in London. She is also involved in the recruitment, training and mentoring of new magistrates.

== Freedom charity ==
Prem is the founder and lifetime President of the Freedom charity, which works to protect the lives of children and young people by raising awareness of forced marriage in the UK and the associated problem of dishonour-based violence.

Freedom was established by Prem at the end of 2010. The charity's Chair of Trustees is Lord Toby Harris and the CEO is Vineeta Thornhill.

== Author ==
Aneeta has written two novels aimed at children and young people aged nine years and over. They are called "But It's Not Fair" and "Cut Flowers". "But It's Not Fair draws on her extensive experience supporting child victims of Forced Marriage and dishonour based crimes through her work with the Foreign and Commonwealth Office, Government Ministers, the police, survivors and her experiences as a magistrate. The story is written from the view of a young British girl, Vinny, whose friend almost becomes a victim of Forced Marriage. The book is presented in a chatty and easy-to-read style, but it carries some powerful messages. It not only raises awareness of Forced Marriage and highlights some of the key signs associated with Forced Marriage, but it also suggests courses of action that could help potential victims. Freedom Charity distributes copies of "But It's Not Fair" free to schools, alongside lesson plans for teachers. The newest novel "Cut Flowers" is about female genital mutilation FGM. Katie and Sophia are just two ordinary girls eagerly awaiting the summer holidays until their teacher, Miss Adams, gives them their summer homework – to prepare a presentation about what they did over the holidays. Little did they know that it would be the start of a lifelong mission to protect young girls all over the world. When Katie finally returns from Africa she needs all of Sophia’s support and creative flair to shine a spotlight on something that’s affecting millions of girls worldwide, but that no one seems to want to talk about... The book has PSHE Association lesson plans to accompany it.

== Honours, awards and achievements ==
Prem is an active member of her local community, has been a primary school governor and has received public recognition for the voluntary and mentoring work she has carried out in London. She received the Commissioner's Commendation for the work she did leading, in an oversight capacity, the South-East Asia Tsunami Police Rescue effort in December 2004 and January 2005 for the Metropolitan Police Authority (MPA). She has been the MPA lead member for forced marriages and dishonour based violence, working closely with the Foreign and Commonwealth Office and many victims, survivors and community groups to provide independent advice. She also led on MPA estate and property issues, encompassing over 600 operational buildings used by almost 50,000 police officers and staff with a property budget of £1.3 billion. She was also given the lead on Hindu, Sikh and Buddhist issues at the MPA. Prem was the youngest Asian female black belt karate instructor and she established and ran seven karate clubs in the UK.

Prem is one of the people featured in the video produced by the UK Home Office and Freedom Charity to help raise awareness of the change in legislation on 16 June that made forcing someone into marriage a criminal offence.

She was awarded an honorary Doctor of Letters from the University of Winchester October 2015. The London Evening Standard Progress 1000 Award recognised as one of London's most influential people of the years 2015 and 2016. Prem was awarded the GG2 Leadership Spirit In The Community Award at a ceremony held in London on Wednesday 5 November 2014

Prem was in the Independent on Sunday's Happy List 2014 (awarded to people who make life better for others). Prem was chosen by British Airways to be featured as part of their BA 100 campaign. The campaign celebrated 100 makers of Modern Britain, people who make Britain the creative, open-minded, pioneering and welcoming place it is today. She was appointed Member of the Order of the British Empire (MBE) in the 2023 New Year Honours for charitable service.

== Trigeminal Neuralgia ==
Aneeta's experience of bilateral Trigeminal Neuralgia began in 2010, with severe pain and resulting sleep deprivation. Her condition remained undiagnosed until 2017. She underwent microvascular decompression surgery at UCHL to ameliorate the pain on the right-hand side in December 2019.
