= Trigeminal trophic syndrome =

- Other names: Trigeminal trophic lesion
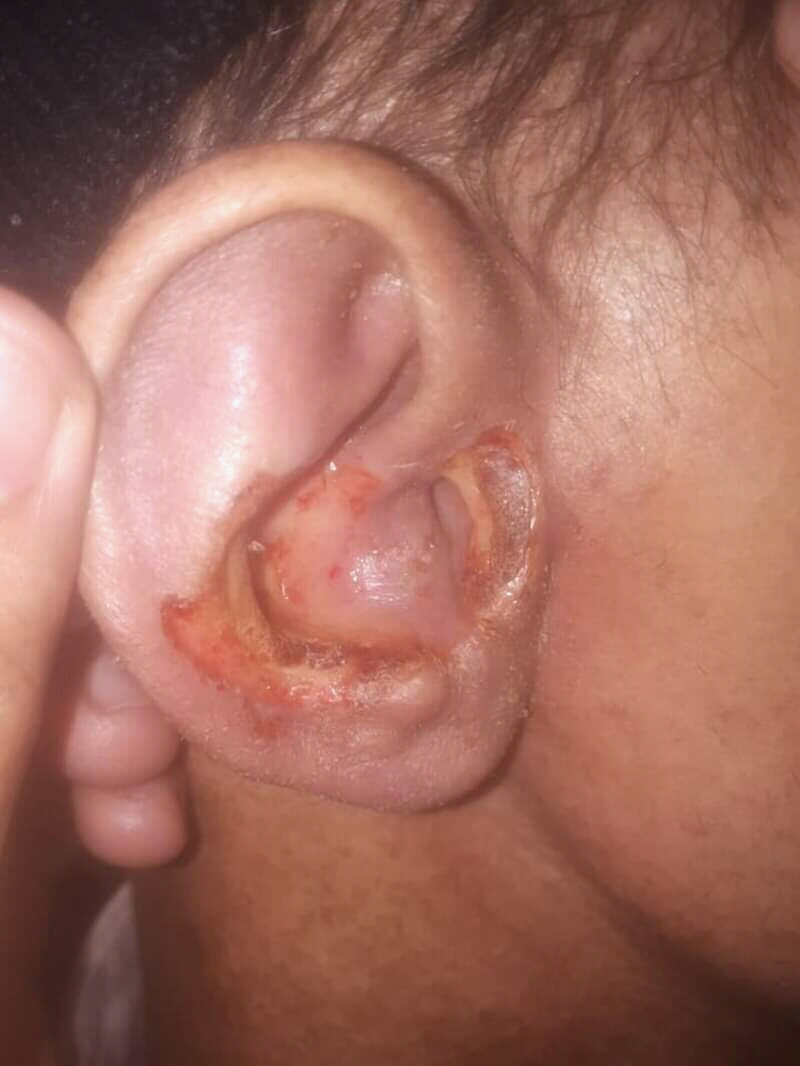
- Specialty: Dermatology

Trigeminal trophic syndrome is a rare disease caused by the interruption of peripheral or central sensory pathways of the trigeminal nerve. A slowly enlarging, uninflamed ulcer can occur in the area that has had trigeminal nerve damage; including but not limited to the cheek beside the ala nasi.

== Signs and symptoms ==
The most common complaints are feelings of picking, rubbing, or scratching in the afflicted areas. A nonhealing ulcer is present in most patients. The ala nasi is frequently affected by a recognizable, painless, sickle-shaped lesion with a well-defined margin. The ulcers are incredibly persistent once they start.

== Causes ==
Trigeminal trophic syndrome can present with the following conditions and diseases: Amyloid deposits in the CNS and trigeminal nerve, trauma, craniotomy, tumor, Wallenberg syndrome (stroke/vascular insufficiency), herpes zoster, herpes simplex, syphilis, and neurological complications from birth trauma, or it can be idiopathic.

== Treatment ==
Treating trigeminal trophic syndrome is a difficult task. Among the options are transcutaneous nerve stimulation, protective dressings, behavioral modification, medication intervention, and surgical repair; however, none of these have been proven to be consistently effective.

== Epidemiology ==
Sixty cases were reported from 1982 to 2002. Trigeminal trophic syndrome is more common in women than in men.

== See also ==
- Trigeminal neuralgia
- Skin lesion
- List of cutaneous conditions
- Somatosensory system
