= Freedom (charity) =

Organization supporting victims of forced marriage

Freedom Charity
- Founded: 11 August 2009
- Founder: Aneeta Prem
- Type: Educational and support charity
- Registration no.: 1139657
- Purpose: Victims of forced marriage and related violence
- Location: London
- Region served: United Kingdom
- Product: Education, advice, helpline, book, smartphone app
- Key people: Toby Harris, Vineeta Thornhill
- Website: www.freedomcharity.org.uk

Freedom or Freedom Charity is a UK-based charity which supports victims of forced marriage, female genital mutilation (FGM) and family dishonor. The charity was founded in 2009 by Aneeta Prem and the chair of trustees is Toby Harris.

== Awareness and helpline for forced marriage, FGM and dishonour abuse ==
The charity provides educational material and teaching and training programmes for schools & front line professionals and runs a 24/7 helpline supported by trained professionals. It is thought there may be 8,000 forced marriages each year in Britain and it is most prevalent in communities originating in South Asia.

The charity operates its own website and also uses social media websites. In conjunction with the UK government's Forced Marriage Unit and the Metropolitan Police, the charity provides a smartphone app which, to divert suspicion, ostensibly looks like a game but which gives information regarding forced marriage for victims and carers and allows helplines to be called and emergency help to be summoned. The organisation aims to give every teenager in Britain a copy of Prem's book But It's Not Fair, a book with governmental recommendation.

Freedom Charity was founded by Aneeta Prem, a magistrate, who was born in London. When working as a karate teacher in London, Prem encountered the problem of forced marriages when teaching martial arts to young women.

On 16 June 2014, The Anti-Social Behaviour, Crime and Policing Act 2014 (UK) made forcing someone into marriage a criminal offence. The charity marked the change in legislation by launching a hashtag campaign #freedom2choose and a video to help raise awareness of the change in legislation was produced. The video featured The Home Secretary, Theresa May; Aneeta Prem, founder of Freedom Charity; Sophie Lott from the government's Forced Marriage Unit; Commander Mak Chishty, National Police Lead on Forced Marriage; Nazir Afzal, Chief Crown Prosecutor of the Crown Prosecution Service for North West England, Edward Pleeth, a barrister; plus an anonymous victim of forced marriage,

== Domestic slavery rescue ==
In October 2013, the organisation was contacted by three women in London saying they had been held as domestic slaves for thirty years. A television documentary on forced marriages, Exposure, followed by an interview with Prem describing the work of Freedom Charity, had prompted one of the victims to call the helpline. Freedom contacted the Metropolitan Police who managed the women's rescue with the assistance of the charity which held secret telephone calls with the captives. Two suspects were arrested.

== Red Triangle symbol ==
An inverted red triangle containing a gold heart is the international symbol for solidarity against female genital mutilation (FGM).

The symbol was first used in 2016 by Aneeta Prem in her novel Cut Flowers and further more as part of the Freedom Charity Red Triangle Campaign on 6 February 2016 for the International Day of Zero Tolerance for Female Genital Mutilation.

The National Police Chiefs’ Council and Freedom charity campaign sold red triangle badges to raise awareness among people that FGM is a crime. The proceeds were used to supply books about FGM to schools.

The Red Triangle symbol represents the female form.

=== Origins ===
The red triangle (FGM) symbol was devised by Aneeta Prem, a British author, human rights campaigner, magistrate and the founder and president of Freedom Charity.

=== Red Triangle campaign 2017 ===
Monday 6 February 2017 saw Freedom Charity launch the Red Triangle campaign. Set to run until International Women's Day on 8 March, the campaign aims to help eradicate FGM in a generation. Those taking part in the campaign are encouraged to wear a small downward facing red triangle to symbolise solidarity against FGM.

== Cut Flowers ==
Cut Flowers is a novel written by Aneeta Prem, the founder of Freedom. The novel is about FGM. Katie and Sophia are two ordinary girls eagerly awaiting the summer holidays until their teacher, Miss Adams, gives them their summer homework – to prepare a presentation about what they did over the holidays. Little did they know that it would be the start of a lifelong mission to protect young girls all over the world. When Katie finally returns from Africa she needs all of Sophia's support and creative flair to shine a spotlight on something that's affecting millions of girls worldwide, but that no one seems to want to talk about. The book has PSHE Association lesson plans to accompany it. The book warns about the dangers of FGM, and is being distributed to schoolchildren to raise awareness of the illegal practice.

== But It's Not Fair ==
But It's Not Fair, another novel by Aneeta Prem, draws Prem's extensive experience supporting child victims of forced marriage and dishonour based crimes through her work with the Foreign and Commonwealth Office, Government Ministers, the police, survivors and her experiences as a magistrate. The story is written from the view of a young British girl, Vinny, whose friend almost becomes a victim of forced marriage. The book is presented in a chatty and easy-to-read style, but it carries some powerful messages. It not only raises awareness of forced marriage and highlights some of the key signs associated with forced marriage, but it also suggests courses of action that could help potential victims. Freedom Charity distributes copies of But It's Not Fair free to schools, alongside lesson plans for teachers.
