= Microvascular decompression =

Neurosurgical procedure

Microvascular decompression (MVD), also known as the Jannetta procedure, is a neurosurgical procedure used to treat trigeminal neuralgia (along with other cranial nerve neuralgias), a pain syndrome characterized by severe episodes of intense facial pain, and hemifacial spasm. The procedure is also used experimentally to treat tinnitus and vertigo caused by vascular compression on the vestibulocochlear nerve. As the goal of the Jannetta procedure is to relieve (vascular) pressure on the trigeminal nerve, it is a specific type of a nerve decompression surgery.

== History ==
Nicholas Andre first described trigeminal neuralgia in 1756. In 1891 Sir Victor Horsley proposed the first open surgical procedure for the disorder involving the sectioning of preganglionic rootlets of the trigeminal nerve. Walter Dandy in 1925 was an advocate of partial sectioning of the nerve in the posterior cranial fossa. During this procedure he noted compression of the nerve by vascular loops, and in 1932 proposed the theory that trigeminal neuralgia was caused by compression of the nerve by blood vessels, typically the superior cerebellar artery. With the advent of the operative microscope, Peter J. Jannetta was able to further confirm this theory in 1967 and advocated moving the offending vessel and placing a sponge to prevent the vessel from returning to its native position as a treatment for trigeminal neuralgia.

== Patient selection ==
Patients most likely to benefit from a microvascular decompression have a classic form of trigeminal neuralgia. The diagnosis of this disorder is on the basis of the patients' symptoms and from a neurological examination. No blood test or genetic marker exists to diagnose the disease. An MRI scan can help eliminate other diagnoses. Newer MRI techniques may allow for the visualization of vascular compression of the nerve. Patients who improve with an MVD are likely to have pain which is episodic rather than constant. The pain typically has an electrical quality to it and is intense. The pain can usually be triggered. Common triggers include light touch, eating, talking or putting on make-up. Most patients whose face pain improved with an MVD also improved at least temporarily with medication.

In addition to having the proper type of pain, candidates for an MVD must also be healthy enough to undergo surgery. The risk of surgery may increase with increasing patient age.

== Surgical technique ==
Microvascular decompression in hemifacial spasm. Source: Rhomberg, T., Eördögh, M., Lehmann, S. et al. Endoscope-assisted microvascular decompression in hemifacial spasm with a teflon bridge. Acta Neurochir 166, 239 (2024). https://doi.org/10.1007/s00701-024-06142-7

Patients are put to sleep using general anaesthesia and are positioned on their back with their head turned or on their side with the symptomatic side facing up. Electrical monitoring of facial function and hearing is used. A straight incision is made two finger-breadths behind the ear about the length of the ear. A portion of the skull around 30 mm (1.2 inches) in diameter is removed exposing the underlying brain covering known as the dura. The dura is opened to expose the cerebellum. The cerebellum is allowed to fall out of the way exposing the side of the brainstem. Using a microscope or endoscope and micro-instruments, the arachnoid membrane is dissected allowing visualization of the 8th, 7th and finally the trigeminal nerve. The offending loop of blood vessel is then mobilized. Frequently a groove or indentation is seen in the nerve where the offending vessel was in contact with the nerve. Less often the nerve is thin and pale. Once the vessel is mobilized a sponge like material is placed between the nerve and the offending blood vessel to prevent the vessel from returning to its native position.

After the decompression is complete, the wound is flushed clean with saline solution. The dura is closed in a watertight fashion. The skull is reconstructed and the overlying tissues are closed in multiple layers. The patient is allowed to wake up and is taken to an intensive care unit or other close observation unit.

== Results ==
The largest reported series of MVDs was reported by Jannetta and published in The New England Journal of Medicine in 1996. The initial success rate was 82% for complete relief with an additional 16% having partial relief for a combined initial success rate of 98%. At 10 year follow-up, 68% had excellent or good relief. 32% had recurrent symptoms. Other series report similar or better results.

== Complications ==
Serious complications from an MVD include death (0.1%), stroke (1%), hearing loss (3%) and facial weakness (0.5%). Dr. Jannetta has called facial paralysis (as opposed to weakness) a "major and common complication of the MVD." (2 separate depositions under oath: Levy v Jannetta, CCP Allegheny County, GD 81–7689.)

Other complications include leakage of spinal fluid and wound infection (1%). Most patients will have transient neck pain and stiffness from the surgical incision and from seeding of the spinal fluid with small amounts of blood.

== Other procedures ==
Several other surgical procedures exist for the treatment of trigeminal neuralgia, including percutaneous rhizotomy, percutaneous glycerol injection, percutaneous balloon compression, rhyzotomy and stereotactic radiosurgery (SRS). When compared to the other procedures, MVD carries the highest long-term success rate, but it also carries the highest risk.

== See also ==
- nerve decompression
