= Dan J. Stein =

South African psychiatrist (1962–2025)

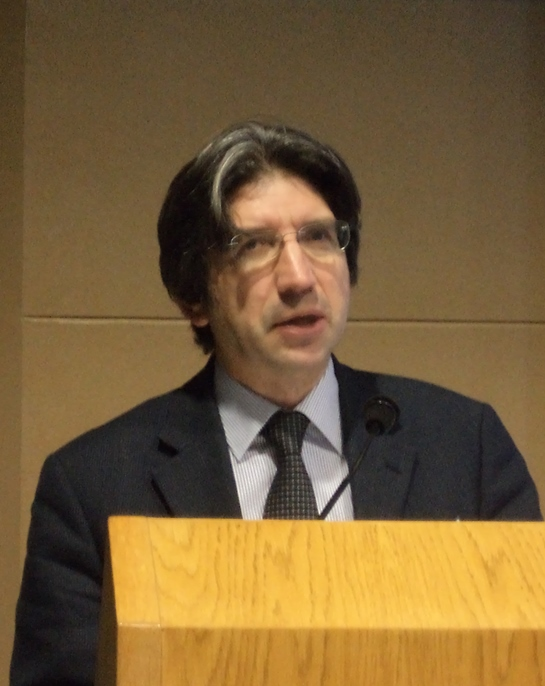
- Stein in 2013
- Born: 17 September 1962
- Died: 5 December 2025 (aged 63)
- Education: University of Cape Town; Columbia University; Stellenbosch University
- Awards: The Max Hamilton Memorial Award. The South African Medical Research Council's Platinum Award. The World Federation of Societies of Biological Psychiatry's Lifetime Achievement Award.
- Scientific career
- Fields: Psychiatry
- Workplaces: University of Cape Town
- Doctoral advisor: Eric Hollander; Robert Spitzer; Jeffrey Young

Dan Joseph Stein (17 September 1962 – 5 December 2025) was a South African psychiatrist who was a professor and Chair of the Dept of Psychiatry and Mental Health at the University of Cape Town, and Director of the South African MRC Unit on Risk & Resilience in Mental Disorders. Stein was the Director of UCT's early Brain and Behaviour Initiative, and was the inaugural Scientific Director of UCT's later Neuroscience Institute. He was also been a visiting professor at Mount Sinai School of Medicine in the United States, and at Aarhus University in Denmark.

== Education ==
Stein studied medicine at the University of Cape Town, including an intercalated undergraduate degree with majors in biochemistry and psychology. He later trained in psychiatry, and completed a post-doctoral fellowship in the area of psychopharmacology at Columbia University. He subsequently completed doctoral degrees in clinical neuroscience as well as in philosophy at Stellenbosch University.

== Interests ==
Stein was interested in the psychobiology and management of the anxiety, obsessive-compulsive and related, and traumatic and stress disorders. He has also mentored work in other areas that are of particular relevance to South Africa and Africa, including maternal mental health, neuroHIV/AIDS, and substance use disorders.

Stein's work ranged from basic neuroscience, through clinical investigations and trials, and on to epidemiological and public mental health research. He advocated for clinical practice and scientific research that integrated theoretical concepts and empirical data across these different levels, strengthening a biopsychosocial approach to mental health.

Having worked for many years in South Africa, he had also sought to establish integrative approaches to improving psychiatric services, training, and research in the context of a low and-middle-income countries.

== Contributions ==
As Chair of the Department of Psychiatry and Mental Health at the University of Cape Town, Stein had led work to integrate and improve psychiatric services, training, and research. He also led the University of Cape Town's Brain-Behaviour Initiative, which in turn provided a foundation for its Neuroscience Institute, the first on the African continent. Stein joined the University of Cape Town (UCT) in 2005.

Soon after returning to South Africa from New York, he initiated the South African Medical Research Council (SAMRC) Unit on Anxiety & Stress Disorders. The Unit undertook basic neuroscience research on anxiety, initiated brain magnetic resonance imaging and neurogenetics research in the country, and conducted the first nationally representative community survey of mental disorders on the continent.

Stein initiated and supported collaborations with and fellowships for African scientists. The Neuro-GAP study brought together researchers from Ethiopia, Kenya, South Africa, and Uganda, to work on the genetics of schizophrenia and bipolar disorder. Stein was the founding President of the African College of Neuropsychopharmacology.

Stein had been part of several international research collaborations, including work on neuroimaging (the Enhancing Neuroimaging by Meta-Analysis (ENIGMA) collaboration) and work on psychiatric epidemiology (the World Mental Health (WMH) Surveys). He chaired the workgroups of both the 5th edition of the Diagnostic and Statistical Manual of Mental Disorders (DSM-5) and the 11th edition of the International Classification of Disorders (ICD-11) on obsessive-compulsive and related disorders.

Stein was ranked as one of the most cited anxiety disorder researchers globally, and his Google h-index is more than 150, one of the highest of any African scholar.

== Publications ==
Stein authored or edited over 40 volumes. These include volumes on clinical neuroscience: Cognitive-Affective Neuroscience of Mood and Anxiety Disorders; on clinical disorders: Handbook of Obsessive-Compulsive and Related Disorders; and on global mental health: Global Mental Health and Psychotherapy. He authored the Textbook of Anxiety Disorders, and the Textbook of Mood Disorders.

Stein contributed hundreds of papers and chapters, again covering a broad range of topics. These include papers in leading journals in science (e.g. Science), medicine (e.g. Lancet), and psychiatry (e.g. World Psychiatry), as well as chapters in key textbooks of psychiatry.

=== Psychiatry writings ===
The notion of an obsessive-compulsive spectrum of disorders goes back at least to Freud, and was framed neurobiologically by Judith Rapaport, Eric Hollander, and others, who found that these conditions responded to serotonergic agents (such as clomipramine) but not to noradrenergic agents (such as desipramine). Stein was Hollander's first post-doctoral fellow, and subsequently led work in the area of obsessive-compulsive spectrum of disorders, including work on trichotillomania, and contributed to a number of publications for the DSM-5 and ICD-11 Workgroups on OC spectrum disorders, supporting the inclusion of these conditions in both nosologies.

Since Darwin, it has been clear that animals show emotions such as fear. Subsequent laboratory research has demonstrated the value of rodent models in exploring fear conditioning and extinction, with the hope that this work may help us understand human anxiety disorders. In collaboration with Brian Harvey, Stein has contributed to work on animal models relevant to understanding the neurobiology of obsessive-compulsive disorder and post-traumatic stress disorder. In particular, they helped to establish the deermouse model of stereotypy.

Brain imaging has played a key role in shedding light on mental disorders. However, much of this work has been based on small samples. Paul Thompson initiated ENIGMA, the world’s largest brain imaging consortium in order to address this issue, and advance work on neuroimaging of neuropsychiatric disorders. Stein has co-led ENIGMA-OCD with Odile van den Heuvel, ENIGMA-Anxiety with Nic van der Wee, Janna-Marie Bas-Hoogendam, and Nynke Groenewold; and ENIGMA-HIV with Neda Jehanshad. This work has led to a number of key findings, including publications emphasizing the role of the thalamus in OCD.

Genetic research has played an increasingly large role in research on neuropsychiatric conditions. Again, the issue of achieving sufficient statistical power is an important one, and the Psychiatric Genetics Consortium has been formed to combine genetics data from across the world. Stein has contributed data to a range of PGC publications, including work on OCD and PTSD. It is notable that such work has focused largely on individuals of European ancestry. In collaboration with Mary-Claire King, Ezra Susser, Karestan Koenen, and others Stein has helped lead work on genetics of mental disorders in individuals of African ancestry. This has helped demonstrate the enormous potential of such investigations.

Urbach-Wiethe disease (UWD) is a rare genetic disorder characterized by early damage to the basolateral amygdala. Perhaps more than 50% of the world's population of UWD live in South Africa, and together with his doctoral student, Helena Thornton, Stein initiated work on the neuropsychology of UWD. Jack van Honk subsequently led a range of work on this condition. These investigations have shed important light on the specific contribution of the basolateral amygdala (BLA) to a range of cognitive-affective processes. For example, the BLA adaptively regulates escape behavior from imminent threat, a mechanism that is evolutionary conserved across rodents and humans. Furthermore, the human BLA is essential for instrumental behaviors in social-economic interactions.

Stein participated in a range of clinical trials, including work on both pharmacotherapy andpsychotherapy. First, Stein has led or contributed to trials on anxiety and related disorders, including generalized anxiety disorder, obsessive-compulsive disorder, panic disorder, post-traumatic stress disorder, social anxiety disorder, and trichotillomania. Second, Stein has led or contributed to a range of systematic reviews of such work, including a number of reviews for the Cochrane Collaboration, a key consortium in evidence-based health care. Third, in the context of the low-middle income world, where there are limited numbers of psychiatrists and psychologists, it has been suggested that task-sharing approaches may be particularly relevant, and Stein has contributed to a number of trials of such interventions.

The development of the 3rd edition of the Diagnostic and Statistical Manual of Mental Disorders allowed the development of structured diagnostic interviews which could be used in epidemiological studies of psychiatric disorders. Ronald Kessler played a key role in leading such work, and is Principal Investigator of the World Mental Health Surveys. In collaboration with Kessler, David Williams, and others, Stein undertook the first nationally representative survey of mental disorders in an African country. Additionally, he has led several cross-national publications of the World Mental Health Surveys, and contributed to a number of publications of the Global Burden of Disease Consortium.

The Drakenstein Child Health Study is a birth cohort study led by Heather Zar, and allows integrated investigation of the biological, psychological, and social determinants of health. Stein led work on the psychosocial aspects of the Study, and his team contributed findings on the relationship between maternal post-traumatic stress disorder and infant outcomes, on the association of maternal exposure to alcohol with infant brain imaging, and on the impact of maternal HIV status on infant neurodevelopment. Work, such as that on how prenatal exposure tomaternal psychological distress induces neuronal, immunological and behavioral abnormalities inaffected offspring, exemplifies a multidisciplinary approach that integrates a range of different risk and resilience variables, and that delineates relevant underlying mechanisms.

=== Philosophy writings ===
Stein integrated his interests in psychiatry, neuroscience, and philosophy in his volumes on The Philosophy of Psychopharmacology: Smart Pills, Happy Pills, Pep Pills and Problems of Living: Perspectives from Philosophy, Psychiatry, and Cognitive-Affective Science.

Psychiatry raised some key “big questions”, both about the nature of the mind (and mental illness) in particular, and about the nature of life (and mental suffering) in general. Philosophy of Psychopharmacology addresses some of the "hard problems" faced by mental health clinicians, with a particular focus on philosophical issues raised or addressed by advances in psychiatric medication. Problems of Living looks at a range of "hard problems" raised by life as a whole.

== Death ==
Stein died on 6 December 2025, at the age of 63.

== Awards ==
Stein's work was funded by extramural grants, including a range of funding from the National Institutes of Health. He was a recipient of the International College of Neuropsychopharmacology's Max Hamilton Memorial Award for his contribution to psychopharmacology, the South African Medical Research Council's Platinum Award, and the World Federation of Societies of Biological Psychiatry's Lifetime Achievement Award.
