= SSD-12 =

Questionnaire

The Somatic Symptom Disorder - B Criteria Scale (SSD-12) is a brief self-report questionnaire used to assess the B criteria of DSM-5 somatic symptom disorder, i.e. the patients’ perceptions of their symptom-related thoughts, feelings, and behaviors.

== The questionnaire ==
The SSD-12 is composed of 12 items. Each of the three psychological sub-criteria of DSM-5 somatic symptom disorder (cognitive, affective, behavioral) is measured by four items with all item scores ranging between 0 and 4 (0 = never, 1 = rarely, 2 = sometimes, 3 = often, 4 = very often). The order of the 12 items alternates between the three subcriteria (Subcriteria 1, 2, 3, 1, 2, 3...etc.). Ratings are summed up to make a simple sum score (which can vary between 0 and 48 points).

== Development ==
The SSD-12 is a further development of the Somatic Symptoms Experiences Questionnaire. The 12 items of the SSD-12 were derived from a large initial item pool of 98 items via a mixture of qualitative (focus groups involving researchers and clinicians) and quantitative methods (psychometric analysis).

== Psychometric properties ==
Psychometric properties of the SSD-12 were examined in three different samples from Germany (psychosomatic outpatient clinic, n = 698; general population, n =2362; primary care, n = 501).

=== Reliability ===
Internal consistency (Cronbach's alpha) of the scale is demonstrated by Cronbach's between α = .92 and α = .95.

=== Validity ===
==== Content validity ====
The content validity is supposed to be high because the items are based on the DSM-5 criteria of somatic symptom disorder.

==== Construct validity ====
The SSD-12 showed positive associations with somatic symptom burden, health anxiety, depression, and anxiety. Moreover, high SSD-12 scores were associated with poor self-reported general well-being and frequent health care use.

==== Factorial validity ====
The SSD-12 consists of a three-factorial structure which reflects the three psychological criteria interpreted as cognitive, affective and behavioural aspects of the DSM-5 B criteria of somatic symptom disorder.

==== Objectivity ====
The instrument is straightforward to complete, has an easy scoring algorithm (addition of the responses), and is simple to interpret. There are gender and age specific norm values from the general population and cut-off values from a clinical sample. Given this, the objectivity of the instrument is supposed to be high.

==== Sensitivity to change ====
In a German inpatient sample from a psychosomatic rehabilitation setting, Hüsing et al. 2018 showed that the SSD-12 is sensitive to change. A decrease of 3 points reflected a minimal clinically important difference.

== Interpretation and normative data ==
The provided norms enable researchers and clinicians to compare SSD-12 scores with reference values of a general population sample. In a clinical sample a cut-point of ⩾23 for the SSD-12 proved to be suitable to identify patients at risk for SSD

== Combination of the SSS-8 or the PHQ-15 with the SSD-12 to detect DSM-5 somatic symptom disorder ==
The SSD-12 can be used in combination with the Patient Health Questionnaire-15 (PHQ-15). and the Somatic Symptom Scale-8 (SSS-8) to identify persons at risk for SSD. Optimal combined cutpoints were ⩾9 for the PHQ-15 or SSS-8, and ⩾23 for the SSD-12 (sensitivity and specificity = 69% and 70%)

== Translations ==
The original SSD-12 was published in German and English. To date (June 2025), at least three psychometrically validated and culturally adapted translations are available:

- Dutch
- Chinese
- French
