= Generalized Anxiety Disorder 7 =

Anxiety disorder screening instrument

Generalized Anxiety Disorder 7 item
- Synonyms: GAD-7
- LOINC: 69737-5

The Generalized Anxiety Disorder 7-item scale (GAD-7) is a widely used self-administered diagnostic tool designed to screen for and assess the severity of generalized anxiety disorder (GAD). Comprising seven items, the GAD-7 measures the frequency of anxiety symptoms over the past two weeks, with respondents rating each item on a scale from "not at all" to "nearly every day." The GAD-7 was developed in 2006 by Robert L. Spitzer, Janet B.W. Williams, Kurt Kroenke, and Bernd Löwe as a brief self-report questionnaire designed to assess symptoms associated with generalized anxiety disorder. It has been used in clinical and research settings for screening purposes and for monitoring symptom changes over time. It is valued for its simplicity, reliability, and validity in detecting anxiety symptoms in diverse populations.

The GAD-7 is normally used in outpatient and primary care settings for referral to a psychiatrist pending outcome. A systematic review compared screening tools and concluded that the GAD-7 is the most efficient one for identifying GAD as well as panic disorders in primary care populations.

== Criteria ==
The GAD-7 has seven items, which measure severity of various signs of GAD according to reported response categories with assigned points. The GAD-7 items include:

1. Nervousness
2. Inability to stop worrying
3. Excessive worry
4. Restlessness
5. Difficulty in relaxing
6. Easy irritation
7. Fear of something awful happening

Response options range from "not at all" (= 0 points), "several days" (= 1 point), "more than half the days" (= 2 points), and "nearly every day" (= 3 points) with a score range from 0-21 points.

== Interpretation of results ==
The assessment is indicated by the total score, which is made up by adding together the scores for the scale of all seven items, with responses getting 0 to 3 points:

- Not at all (0 points)
- Several days (1 point)
- More than half the days (2 points)
- Nearly every day (3 points)

The normative data enable users of the GAD-7 to discern whether an individual's anxiety score is normal, or mildly, moderately, or severely elevated. However, while the GAD-7 seem to be able to provide probable cases of GAD, it cannot be used as replacement for clinical assessment and additional evaluation should be used to confirm a diagnosis of GAD.

Score	Risk Level	Suggested Intervention
0–4	No to Low risk	None
5–9	Mild	Repeat on follow-up
10–14	Moderate	Further evaluation required. Consider adjusting treatment plan.
15+	Severe	Adjust treatment plan. Higher level of care needed. Pharmacology re-evaluation.

== Reliability and validity ==
The GAD-7 was originally validated in a primary care sample and a cutoff score of 10 (which the authors considered optimal) had a sensitivity value of 0.89 and a specificity value of 0.82 for identifying GAD. The authors of the questionnaire also found acceptable sensitivity and specificity values when the questionnaire was used as a general screen to identify other anxiety disorders (Panic Disorder, Social Anxiety, and PTSD) (GAD-7, score ≥ 8: sensitivity: 0.77, specificity: 0.82).

The GAD-7 has further been studied and validated in numerous other samples and settings. It has been shown to correlate with other measures of anxiety and has been considered superior to other questionnaires. The GAD-7 has been evaluated in samples of both children and young individuals as well as older adults. It has been used in more than 2500 peer reviewed publications indexed in PubMed (current search here). The consensus is that it can be an efficient tool for screening for GAD and assessing its severity in clinical practice and research. A meta-analysis found that it achieved acceptable accuracy at a cutoff point of 8 (sensitivity of 0.83, specificity: 0.84, pooling 12 samples and 5223 participants).

The use of sumscores (i.e. summing the scores of each item) is supported by psychometric studies in some contexts, but using techniques based on factor analysis are deemed more precise.

== GAD-7 distribution from a representative US sample ==
The following table shows the GAD-7 item responses from the National Health Interview Survey (NHIS) during 2019. The responses for all seven items show a similar pattern, with the frequency being highest for “not at all,” decreasing from “not at all” to “more than half the days,” and increasing from “more than half the days” to “nearly every day” Recent research suggests that item responses to the GAD-7, when administered to the general population, follow the same mathematical distribution as those of depression-rating scales.

	Item	"0" (Not at all)	"1"(several days)	"2"(more than half the days)	"3" (nearly every day)
1	Nervousness	74.2%	16.7%	2.9%	3.9%
2	Inability to stop worrying	80.7%	10.6%	2.3%	4.1%
3	Excessive worry	74.3%	15.8%	2.8%	4.7%
4	Difficulty in relaxing	78.6%	12.4%	2.5%	4.2%
5	Restlessness	86.3%	7.2%	1.5%	2.8%
6	Easy irritation	73.4%	17.5%	3.2%	3.7%
7	Fear of something awful happening	85.5%	8.2%	1.6%	2.4%

The following table shows the distribution of GAD-7 scores from the National Health Interview Survey(NHIS) during 2019. The GAD-7 score ≥ 10, which is the standard cutoff for indicating moderate anxiety, captures about 6.1% of the US adult population.

Score	0-4	5-9	10-14	15-21
Percent	84.4%	9.5%	3.4%	2.7%
Percentile	84.4%	93.9%	97.3%	100%

== See also ==
- Diagnostic classification and rating scales used in psychiatry
- Patient Health Questionnaire
