= MUPS =

MUPS may refer to:

- Major urinary proteins
- Medically unexplained physical symptoms
- the Missing and Unidentified Persons Unit, part of the California Department of Justice
