= Janet B. W. Williams =

American social worker (born 1947)

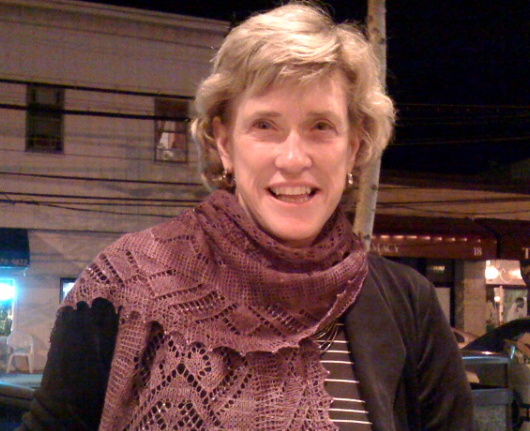
- Born: November 15, 1947
- Education: Tufts University (BS), University of Massachusetts Dartmouth (MS), Columbia University (MS, DSW)
- Known for: Modernizing the classification of mental disorders, and the evaluation of psychopathology
- Spouse: Robert Spitzer (died 2015)
- Children: 3
- Scientific career
- Fields: Psychiatry, Social Work
- Workplaces: Columbia University

Janet B. W. Williams (born November 15, 1947) is an American social worker who focuses on the diagnosis and assessment of mental disorders. She is Professor Emerita of Clinical Psychiatric Social Work (in Psychiatry & Neurology) at Columbia University. She was a major force in writing the PHQ-9, a 9-question instrument given to patients in a primary care setting to screen for the presence and severity of depression.

== Education ==
Williams received her undergraduate degree in biology from Tufts University and then went on to get a master's degree in Marine Biology at the University of Massachusetts Dartmouth. Shortly afterwards, she got her master's degree and Doctorate of Social Work in Social Welfare from Columbia University.

== Career ==
Williams is well known for her work in psychiatric classifications and the instruments she developed to measure psychopathology. Most notably, she was the text editor of DSM-III and DSM-III-R as well as a member of the Task Force on DSM-IV. She is co-author of PRIME MD and its derivative, the PHQ.

Williams has written frequently on diagnosis and assessment. She is an author of the Structured Clinical Interview for DSM-IV (SCID), as well as the Structured Interview Guide for the Montgomery Asberg Depression Rating Scale (SIGMA) and the Structured Interview Guide for the Hamilton Depression Scale (SIGH-D). Williams has been recognized as an ISI Highly Cited Researcher, authoring over 230 scholarly publications throughout her career.

Society for Social Work and Research (SSWR)

Now with over 1300 members, the Society for Social Work and Research] (SSWR) was founded in 1994 by Williams. At its inception, she served as its president for two years.

DSM-III (1980)

In 1974, the American Psychiatric Association started work on the third edition of its Diagnostic and Statistical Manual of Mental Disorders (DSM-III), and appointed Robert Spitzer (Williams’ husband) to lead the effort. Williams worked closely with Spitzer, and was the text editor of DSM-III and DSM-III-R. She was the chairperson of the DSM-IV multiaxial work group and was recognized by the American Psychiatric Association as an Honorary Fellow for her role in the manuals.

PHQ & PRIME MD

In the mid-1990s, Williams (along with Robert Spitzer and Kurt Kroenke) developed the PHQ (Patient Health Questionnaire) and the PRIME MD (Primary care Evaluation of Medical Disorders), both of which were designed to help primary care physicians screen for the presence of mental disorders and the severity of depression.

== Personal life ==
Williams is the widow of Robert Spitzer and has three children (Gideon Spitzer-Williams, Ezra Spitzer-Williams, Noah Spitzer-Williams), and one grandchild.

== Awards ==
- Columbia University School of Social Work Alumni Association Hall of Fame, 1999
- Society for Social Work and Research Lifetime Achievement Award, 2000
- Knee/Wittman Award for Outstanding Lifetime Achievement in Health & Mental Health Policy and Practice from the National Association of Social Workers Foundation, 2005
- NASW Social Work Pioneer, 2007
- Fellow, American College of Neuropsychopharmacology (ACNP), 2012
- Andrew C. Leon Distinguished Career Award from the International Society for CNS Clinical Trials and Methodology (ISCTM), 2019

== Books ==
- Psychopathology, a Case Book (with Robert Spitzer and Andrew E. Skodol), McGraw-Hill ISBN 9780070603509
- DSM III Casebook, American Psychiatric Press ISBN 0-89042-051-3
- DSM-IV-TR Casebook, Volume 2: Experts Tell How They Treated Their Own Patients ISBN 9781585622207
- Structured Clinical Interview for DSM-IV Axis II Personality Disorders (SCID-II) ISBN 9780880488105
- User's Guide to Structured Clinical Interview for DSM-5 Disorders (Scid-5-cv): Clinician Version ISBN 9781585625246
- Structured Clinical Interview for DSM-IV Axis I Disorders (SCID-I), Clinician Version (Administration Booklet) ISBN 9780880489324
- Treatment Companion to the DSM-IV-TR Casebook ISBN 9781585621392
- Learning DSM-5 by Case Example, American Psychiatric Association ISBN 9781615370160
- Advances in Mental Health Research: Implications for Practice ISBN 9780880489317
