= Mups =

Mups may refer to:

- Major urinary proteins
- Medically unexplained physical symptoms
