= Michael First =

American psychiatrist

Michael B. First (born 1956) is an American psychiatrist who focuses on diagnostic criteria for mental disorders. He is Professor of Clinical Psychiatry at Columbia University. First was one of the editors of DSM-IV-TR, the Editor of Text and Criteria for the DSM-IV, and the editor of the Structured Clinical Interview for DSM-IV. He also served as consultant to the World Health Organization for the revision of ICD-11.

== Life and career ==
First earned a bachelor's degree in Electrical Engineering and Computer Science from Princeton University in 1978. He then graduated from University of Pittsburgh with a master's degree, also in Computer Science, and a Doctor of Medicine degree in 1983. He did his psychiatric residency at Columbia-Presbyterian Medical Center and a fellowship in biometrics at the New York State Psychiatric Institute. He is certified with the American Board of Psychiatry & Neurology.

First frequently writes on diagnostic criteria, particularly diagnostic controversies. He has written on several of these controversies, including depression, eating disorders, and desire for amputation or paralysis, calling it body integrity identity disorder.

He has provided expert opinion and testimony on several high-profile cases, including the federal trial of the accused Al Qaeda terrorist Zacarias Moussaoui. First co-authored Am I Okay?: A Layman's Guide to the Psychiatrist's Bible with psychiatrist Allen Frances.

== Selected publications ==
- Kupfer DA, First MB, Regier DA (2002). A Research Agenda for DSM-V. American Psychiatric Publishing, ISBN 978-0-89042-292-2
- First, MB; Pincus, HA; Levine, JB; Williams, JB; Ustun, B; Peele, R (Jun 2004). "Clinical utility as a criterion for revising psychiatric diagnoses". Am J Psychiatry. 161 (6): 946–54. PMID 15169680.
- Crawford, TN; Cohen, P; Johnson, JG; Kasen, S; First, MB; Brook, JS (Feb 2005). "Self-Reported Personality Disorder in the Children in the Community Sample: Convergent and Prospective Validity in Late Adolescence and Adulthood". J Pers Disord. 19 (1): 30–52. doi:10.1521/pedi.19.1.30.62179. PMID 15899719.
- First, MB (2005). "Desire for Amputation of a Limb: Paraphilia, Psychosis, or a New Type of Identity Disorder". Psychological Medicine. 2005 (35): 919–928. PMID 15997612.
- First, MB; Westen, D (2007). "Classification for clinical practice: how to make ICD and DSM better able to serve clinicians". International Review of Psychiatry. 19: 473–481. doi:10.1080/09540260701563429. PMID 17896228.
- First MB, Spitzer RL, Williams JBW, Gibbon M: Structured Clinical Interview for DSM-IV (SCID-I) - Research Version, Biometrics Research, New York, NY, USA
- First, MB (December 2010). "DSM-5 proposals for paraphilias: suggestions for reducing false positives related to use of behavioral manifestations". Arch Sex Behav. 39: 1239–44, author reply 1245–1252. doi:10.1007/s10508-010-9657-5. PMID 20697936.
- Kendler, KS; First, MB (Oct 2010). "Alternative futures for the DSM revision process: iteration v. paradigm shift". Br J Psychiatry. 197 (4): 263–5. doi:10.1192/bjp.bp.109.076794. PMID 20884947.

== See also ==
- Robert Spitzer
