= Jurosomatic illness =

Medical condition

Jurosomatic illness is a somatic illness brought on by a pending lawsuit.

A segment of John Stossel's show on lawsuit abuse (aired June 14, 2012) was devoted to reporting on this illness. Senator John Barrasso (R-Wyo.), an orthopedic surgeon by education, who was interviewed by Stossel for the episode stated that this is an illness that he had studied in medical school. He described it as a syndrome arising from a legitimate injury and legitimate pain and suffering, which drags out for the duration of the lawsuit, brought on by the stress and anxiety of the continuing lawsuit, as well as anger and fixation on the injury associated with it.

Stossel had also quoted a British psychiatrist Theodore Dalrymple as saying:

If you pay people to suffer, they will suffer... Injuries that... would be self-limiting become permanently crippling... The litigant, formerly healthy, rapidly succumbs to every kind of unprovable ailment: headache, loss of concentration, dizziness, depression... When a man says his whole life has been ruined by some ... accident, I know without having to ask [I am] in the presence of litigation ... It turns hypochondriasis into a way of life.

== See also ==
- Somatic psychology
- Conversion disorder
- Somatic symptom disorder
- Secondary gains
