= Ronald C. Kessler =

American sociologist and professor of health care policy

- Born: April 26, 1947 (age 79)
- Education: New York University (Ph.D. Sociology 1975), Temple University (B.A. Sociology 1970)
- Alma mater: New York University
- Known for: psychiatric epidemiology
- Scientific career
- Fields: psychiatric epidemiology
- Workplaces: Syracuse University, University of Pittsburgh, University of Hawaii, Lehigh University, University of California, Irvine
- Website: scholar.harvard.edu/rckessler/faculty-and-staff

Ronald C. Kessler (born April 26, 1947) is an American professor at Harvard Medical School. His research focuses on the precision treatment of mental illness to determine the appropriate intervention for specific patients. He ranks among the most highly cited researchers in the world, with an h-index of 349 as of June 2025. He developed the Kessler psychological distress scale, which is designed to measure non-specific psychological distress.

== Early years ==
Kessler was born in Bristol, Pennsylvania on April 26, 1947. He graduated with a B.A. in sociology from Temple University in 1970. He went on to complete his M.A. in sociology in 1973 and Ph.D. in sociology in 1975 from New York University.

== Academic career ==
Kessler was a predoctoral Fellow at Health Service Research at Montefiore Hospital in Bronx, New York, from 1972 to 1974. He was a research associate at New York State Psychiatric Institute from 1975 to 1976 and at the Centre for Policy Research from 1976 to 1977.

He was a postdoctoral Fellow at the Department of Psychiatry, University of Wisconsin–Madison from 1977 to 1979. He then worked on the faculty at the University of Michigan for 17 years. He became a professor of health care policy at Harvard Medical School in 1996.

In 2008, Kessler was elected a member of American National Academy of Sciences in the categories of Social Sciences and Political Science.

== Research ==
Kessler is the principal investigator of the National Comorbidity Survey (NCS). The NCS was the first nationally representative survey of the prevalence and correlates of psychiatric disorders in the United States. The survey was carried out in 1991 and 1992.

He co-developed his psychological stress scale in 1992 alongside Dan Mroczek.

He is also the principal investigator of several NCS extensions, including a 10-year follow-up of the baseline NCS sample and a replication of the NCS in 2001 and 2002 to study changes in mental health and treatment of mental disorders in the U.S. over the decade of the 1990s.

He also codirects the World Health Organization’s World Mental Health (WMH) surveys, a series of nationally representative epidemiological surveys carried out in 28 countries with a combined sample size of over 200,000 respondents. The surveys carried out by World Mental Health are designed to provide information for government planners to help guide investments in mental health care.

He is involved in the design and implementation of several experimental workplace interventions in the United States, Latin America, and Asia aimed at determining the cost-effectiveness of diverse workplace disease management programs from the employer's perspective. He also is involved in the design, implementation, and evaluation of the long-term effects of intervention programs for youth with emotional problems. He also directs the Hurricane Katrina Community Advisory Group, a panel study of psychological adjustment among people who were residents of the areas affected by Hurricane Katrina at the time of the storm.

His current research involves carrying out the NCS adolescent (NCS-A) survey, the first nationally representative survey of adolescent mental health ever done in the United States. The participants are more than 10,000 adolescents and their parents and teachers.
