= Medical Expenditure Panel Survey =

Family of surveys

The Medical Expenditure Panel Survey (MEPS) is a family of surveys intended to provide nationally representative estimates of health expenditure, utilization, payment sources, health status, and health insurance coverage among the noninstitutionalized, nonmilitary population of the United States. This series of government-produced data sets can be used to examine how individuals interact with the medical care system in the United States.

MEPS is administered by the Agency for Healthcare Research and Quality (AHRQ) in three components: the core Household Component, the Insurance/Employer Component, and the Medical Provider Component. Only the Household Component is available for download on the Internet. These components provide comprehensive national estimates of health care use and payment by individuals, families, and any other demographic group of interested

.

== History ==
MEPS was modeled after the National Medical Expenditure Survey (NMES) and the National Medical Care Utilization and Expenditure Survey (NMCUES), which were conducted in 1977 (NMES-1), 1980 (NMCUES), and 1987 (NMES-2). Each of these surveys was tasked with providing data on a representative sample of Americans' interaction with the medical care system. Although the NMES and NMCUES were sampled independently from the U.S. population, each new MEPS sample is drawn from the outgoing National Health Interview Survey panel. MEPS is generally considered the direct descendant of these surveys, and prestigious peer-reviewed journals commonly publish articles that examine trends calculated between MEPS and its predecessors.

== Research topics ==
The Medical Expenditure Panel Survey can be used for a wide range of topics related to the U.S. healthcare system, including Access to Care, Children's Health, Chronic Conditions, Health Insurance, Health Disparities, Women's Health, Prescription Drugs, Individuals with Disabilities, and the Elderly. AHRQ continually produces chartbooks, statistical briefs, and fact sheets using MEPS data which shed light on these various facets of how the American healthcare system functions, what patients experience, how they behave, and who pays for the cost of care.

== Data accessibility ==
The MEPSnet Query Tools interactive table builder allows non-statisticians to select a data year and medical variable(s) of interest, and produce descriptive statistics and crosstabulations of Household Component and Insurance Component data from the AHRQ website.

== Data available ==
The current publicly available Medical Expenditure Panel Survey – Household Component data set consists of six files which describe the demographics and characteristics of the survey population and eight event-level files which capture all interactions with the U.S. medical system.

=== Household Component Full-Year Files ===
The six full-year files include:

- The Full-Year Consolidated Data files (released annually in November) – The main person-level file of the Household Component data set, which includes all demographic and medical characteristics, as well as patient-reported responses to the main survey questions. Since the survey involves five interview rounds over the two-year panel, data from interview rounds 1, 2, and 3 are included for individuals in their first of two years, and data from interview rounds 3, 4, and 5 are included for individuals in their second of two years. These single-year consolidated datafiles can be thought of as the first half of one two-year panel survey stacked on top of the second half of another two-year panel survey.
- The Full-Year Population Characteristics files (released annually in May) – A skeleton version of the person-level consolidated file, which gets released six months before the Consolidated file of the same year but does not include any income or medical expenditure variables.
- The Medical Conditions files (released annually in November) – The medical condition-level file, which can be linked to both the person-level files and the event-level files. Unlike the medical event-level files, which describe a solitary encounter with the U.S. healthcare system, records within the Medical Conditions files contain a distinct ICD-9 code, Clinical Classification Code, and describe only one ailment (illness or injury). In order to view all medical events during the calendar year associated with a particular condition, a many-to-one join can be executed between this file and zero, one, or more of the event-level files' records (on CONDIDX). The medical condition records in this file can also be merged with a many-to-one join to the person-level files (on DUPERSID), where each person may have zero, one, or multiple matching condition records.
- The Jobs files (released annually in May) – The jobs-level data file contains information about each job that each MEPS-HC survey respondent held over the course of the calendar year, including wages, hours, industry, and occupation, as well as various healthcare-related survey questions (such as offers of employer-sponsored insurance, sick day availability, etc.). This file can be merged with the full-year *person-level file (on DUPERSID), with one match per unique job an individual held during the calendar year. It can also be merged with the Person Round Plan file, matching (on JOBSIDX) wherever a private health insurance plan was obtained through a place of employment.
- The Person Round Plan (PRPL) files (released annually in October) – This health insurance plan by interview date file contains information about each private insurance plan covering each individual surveyed, with one record per interview date (three annually). Private health insurance plans include physician/hospital, dental, vision, medigap, and prescription drugs. This file contains health insurance-specific information, such as an edited monthly out-of-pocket insurance premium, source of coverage and premium payment, as well as some questions about the plan holder's satisfaction with the plan. Although this file can be merged with both person-level files (on DUPERSID) and the Jobs files (on JOBSIDX), this file contains one record per person, per plan, per interview and therefore does not easily condense into one-to-one merges. As an analytic shortcut, data users might simply limit this data set to each unique person-plan's first interview record of the year; the first interview number (RN) available for each distinct establishment identifier and policyholder identifier combination (ESTBIDX + PHLDRIDX).
- The Longitudinal Weight files (released annually in December) – This person-level file mirrors the main Consolidated files in terms of contents, except that it contains survey responses for all five rounds and therefore contains half as many observations. The two-year, five-interview survey data aggregated into this file is designed to be representative of two years' worth of medical behavior of the U.S. noninstitutionalized population over the period specified.

=== Household Component Event Files ===
The eight event-level files generally contain one record per event, and contain various information pertaining to the specific type of event. Each record contains one or more ICD-9 codes to describe and categorize the type of medical encounter experienced by the surveyed individual. The event-level files also contain the breakdown of spending by payor associated with the event and a date (or start and end dates) that the event took place. Each of these event files can be joined with the person-level files in a many-to-one match (on DUPERSID), where an individual with zero medical events during the calendar year would generate zero matches, but an individual with two doctor visits and a dental visit would generate three matches across all of the event files. The event-level files can also be joined with the condition files (on CONDIDX) to determine what medical expenditure can be associated with particular conditions. The eight files include:

- The Prescribed Medicines files (released annually in October) – This file contains one household-reported prescribed medicine purchase during the calendar year. Prescription purchases are then verified by the prescribing pharmacy. In addition to the expenditure information, this file contains characteristics of the medication, such as the National Drug Code (NDC) identifier, the drug name, and the Multum Lexicon category. Prescribed medical events may be more difficult to analyze, since the strength of the drug and quantity purchased may vary, despite two separate prescription-events being the same chemical substance. Prescribed medical events may also be more difficult to analyze, since, unlike other recorded medical events, a pharmacy encounter does not guarantee that the medication has been administered (i.e. that the patient stuck to his or her drug regiment). This file should be thought of as containing one record per pharmacy encounter.
- The Dental Visits files (released annually in August) – The file contains one record for each dental visit during the calendar year. It includes dental-specific information such as the type of provider seen, if the visit was due to an accident, reason for the dental event, and any medication was prescribed.
- The Other Medical Expenses files (released annually in August) – This file contains one record for each medical expense that does not fit into any of the other event type categories. The events and expenditures captured in this file are overwhelmingly recorded as Glasses and Contact Lenses, with Durable Medical Equipment (such as Orthopedic items, Prostheses, Hearing Devices) also included.
- The Hospital Inpatient Stays files (released annually in October) – This file contains hospitalization-specific information including the date of and reason for the stay, the types of services received, and any procedure(s) undertaken during the hospital inpatient stay.
- The Emergency Room Visits files (released annually in September) – This file contains emergency room-specific information including the date of and reason for the visit, the types of services received, and any procedures(s) undertaken during the visit. Since many E.R. visits continue into Inpatient Hospital admissions, the spending incurred during any E.R. visit resulting in an Inpatient Hospital Admission gets transferred to the Hospital Inpatient Stays event file (identifiable using the ERHEVIDX variable) and the medical expenditure cannot be divided out between pre- and post-admission.
- The Outpatient Visits files (released annually in September) – This file contains information about each visit to an outpatient hospital setting, including type of test or treatment being provided, whether or not a physician was seen (and if so what specialty), and what condition or diagnosis the visit was related to.
- The Office-based Visits files (released annually in September) – This file captures each office-based encounter of all sampled individuals. This file contains all necessary descriptive information about visits to Primary Care Physicians, specialist physicians, and non-physician medical providers (such as Nurse Practitioners and Physical Therapists) that occurred outside of a hospital setting. In addition to the general event visit information, this file includes certain details about any preventive services, tests, and vaccinations received.
- The Home Health Visits files (released annually in August) – This file contains one record for each time that a certified home health medical practitioner visits a sampled individual. In addition to the standard event file variables, this file contains information about the home health medical provider's credentials and skills, the length of the visit, and the type(s) of care received. This file includes medical visits by hospice providers, which are generally paid for home-based care through the Medicare Hospice benefit.

== Publications ==
The Medical Expenditure Panel Survey is commonly the subject of analysis in articles on health policy and health services in research journals such as Health Affairs, JAMA, Health Services Research, and the New England Journal of Medicine.

== Methodology ==
Noninstitutionalized civilian Americans (both citizens and non-citizens) are sampled at the household, allowing for analyses of medical behavior at the family-level as well as the individual-level. Each year, households containing a total of approximately 15,000 individuals are sub-sampled from the National Health Interview Survey's two year panel. These individuals are then followed with five in-person interviews (rounds) over the course of two years during which a complete demographic profile is collected, all medical encounters are documented, and patient-reported subjective questions regarding topics like satisfaction with care are obtained.

MEPS employs a complex survey sample design in order to oversample certain population groups of interest; this survey design must be accounted for (using either the Taylor Series Linearization method or the Balanced repeated replication method) to appropriately calculate the standard errors.
