= Karestan Koenen =

American epidemiologist

- Born: Karestan Chase Koenen; June 23, 1968 (age 57); Portsmouth, New Hampshire
- Education: Wellesley College; Columbia University; Boston University
- Known for: Research on post-traumatic stress disorder
- Awards: Robert S. Laufer, PhD, Memorial Award for Outstanding Scientific Achievement from the International Society for Traumatic Stress Studies (2015)
- Scientific career
- Fields: Psychiatric epidemiology Psychiatric genetics
- Institutions: Broad Institute; Harvard T.H. Chan School of Public Health
- Thesis: The comorbidity of posttraumatic stress disorder and antisocial personality disorder: An epidemiological and genetic study (1999)
- Doctoral advisor: Michael J. Lyons

Karestan Chase Koenen (born June 23, 1968) is an American epidemiologist and Professor of Psychiatric Epidemiology at the Harvard T.H. Chan School of Public Health. She is also the head of the Global Neuropsychiatric Genomics Initiative of the Stanley Center for Psychiatric Research at the Broad Institute. She is a fellow of the American Psychopathological Association and a former president of the International Society for Traumatic Stress Studies. In 2015, she received the Robert S. Laufer, PhD, Memorial Award for Outstanding Scientific Achievement from the International Society for Traumatic Stress Studies.

== Publications ==
- Treating Survivors of Childhood Abuse and Interpersonal Trauma, the revised and updated version she co-authored, was published in June 2020

== Education ==
In 1990, Koenen received a B.A. in Economics from Wellesley College. After completing her undergraduate degree, she went on to get an M.A. in Development Psychology from Columbia University. She was awarded her Ph.D in Clinical Psychology in 1999 at Boston University, with her thesis titled The comorbidity of posttraumatic stress disorder and antisocial personality disorder: An epidemiological and genetic study. In 2002 she completed her Post-doctoral Fellowship in Psychiatric Epidemiology at Columbia university.

== Career ==
In 2011, Koenen testified before congress about sexual violence committed against Peace Corps volunteers. After her own assault in Niger while serving with the Peace Corps, Koenen began a career researching PTSD and trauma with the goal of helping other women who had been assaulted.
