= Robert Spitzer (psychiatrist) =

American psychiatrist (1932–2015)

- Born: Robert Leopold Spitzer; May 22, 1932; White Plains, New York, U.S.
- Died: December 25, 2015 (aged 83); Seattle, Washington, U.S.
- Education: Cornell University (BA), New York University School of Medicine (MD)
- Occupations: Psychiatrist, professor
- Known for: Modernizing classification of mental disorders, recognizing homosexuality as a non-mental disorder
- Spouses: First wife (divorced); Judith Berg (divorced); Janet B. W. Williams
- Children: 5
- Awards: Joseph Zubin Award (2001)
- Scientific career
- Fields: Psychiatry
- Workplaces: Columbia University
- Doctoral students: Dan J. Stein; Michael First

Robert Leopold Spitzer (May 22, 1932 – December 25, 2015) was a psychiatrist and professor of psychiatry at Columbia University in New York City. He was a major force in the development of the Diagnostic and Statistical Manual of Mental Disorders (DSM).

== Education and early years ==
Spitzer was born in White Plains, New York, in 1932.

He received his bachelor's degree in psychology from Cornell University in 1953 and his M.D. from New York University School of Medicine in 1957. He completed his psychiatric residency at New York State Psychiatric Institute in 1961 and graduated from Columbia University Center for Psychoanalytic Training and Research in 1966.

Spitzer wrote an article on Wilhelm Reich's theories in 1953 which the American Journal of Psychiatry declined to publish.

== Career ==
Spitzer spent most of his career at Columbia University in New York City as a professor of psychiatry until he retired in 2003. He was on the research faculty of the Columbia University Center for Psychoanalytic Training and Research where he retired after 49 years in December 2010. He has been called one of the most influential psychiatrists of the 20th century. The Lancet's obituary described him as "Stubborn, sometimes abrasive, and always eager, Spitzer's work was guided by a strong sense of ethical fairness". A colleague at Columbia has described him as an "iconoclast" who "looked for injustice".

=== Screening and Diagnostic Tools ===
Spitzer was a major architect of the modern classification of mental disorders. In 1968, he co-developed a computer program, Diagno I, based on a logical decision tree, that could derive a diagnosis from the scores on a Psychiatric Status Schedule which he co-published in 1970 and that the United States Steering Committee for the United States–United Kingdom Diagnostic Project used to check the consistency of its results.

Spitzer was a member on the four-person United States Steering Committee for the United States–United Kingdom Diagnostic Project, which published their results in 1972. They found the most important difference between countries was that the concept of schizophrenia used in New York was much broader than the one used in London, and included patients who would have been termed manic-depressive or bipolar.

He developed psychiatric methods that focused on asking specific interview questions to get at a diagnosis as opposed to the open-ended questioning of psychoanalysis, which was the predominant technique of mental health. He codeveloped the Mood Disorder Questionnaire (MDQ), a screening technique used for diagnosing bipolar disorder. He also co-developed the Patient Health Questionnaire (PRIME-MD) which can be self-administered to find out if one has a mental illness. The portions of PRIME-MD directed at depression (PHQ2 and PHQ9) have since become accepted in primary care medicine for screening and diagnosis of major depression as well as for monitoring response to treatment.

=== Position on the Diagnostic and Statistical Manual of Mental Disorders ===
In 1974, Spitzer became the chair of the American Psychiatric Association's task force of the third edition of the Diagnostic and Statistical Manual of Mental Disorders, the so-called DSM-III, which was released in 1980. Spitzer is a major architect of the modern classification of mental disorders, which involves classifying mental disorders in discrete categories with specified diagnostic criteria; however, he later criticized what he saw as errors and excesses in the DSM's later versions, although he maintained his position that the DSM is still better than the alternatives.

In 2003, Spitzer co-authored a position paper with DSM-IV editor Michael First, stating that the "DSM is generally viewed as clinically useful" based on surveys from practicing professionals and feedback from medical students and residents, but that primary care physicians find the DSM too complicated for their use. The authors emphasized that given then-current limitations in understanding psychiatric disorders, a multitude of DSM codes/diagnoses might apply to some patients, but that it would be a "total speculation" to assign a single diagnosis to a patient. The authors rejected calls to adopt the ICD-9 because it lacked diagnostic criteria and would "[set] psychiatry back 30 years," while the ICD-10, closely resembled the DSM-III-R classification. In 2013, a definitive autobiography of Spitzer, The Making of DSM-III: A Diagnostic Manual's Conquest of American Psychiatry, was published by author and historian Hannah S. Decker.

Spitzer was briefly featured in the 2007 BBC TV series The Trap, in which he stated that the DSM, by operationalizing the definitions of mental disorders while paying little attention to the context in which the symptoms occur, may have medicalized the normal human experiences of a significant number of people.

In 2008, Spitzer had criticized the revision process of the DSM-5 for lacking transparency. He has also criticized specific proposals, like the proposed introduction of the psychosis risk syndrome for people who have mild symptoms found in psychotic disorders.

=== On homosexuality ===
Spitzer led a successful effort, in 1973, to stop treating homosexuality as a mental illness.

It was partly due to Spitzer's efforts that homosexuality was "removed" (i.e. renamed as Sexual Orientation Disturbance) in 1974 DSM-II: "By withdrawing it from the manual, homosexuality was legitimized as a normal difference rather than a psychiatric behavior. This early powerful statement by institutional psychiatry that this is normal sped up the confidence of people in the movement."

In 2001, Spitzer delivered a controversial paper, "Can Some Gay Men and Lesbians Change Their Sexual Orientation?" at the 2001 annual APA meeting; he argued that it is possible that some highly motivated individuals could successfully change their sexual orientation from homosexual to heterosexual.

A Washington Post article indicated that Spitzer held 45-minute telephone interviews with 200 people who claimed that their respective sexual orientations had changed from homosexual to heterosexual. Spitzer said he "began his study as a skeptic," but the study revealed that "66 percent of the men and 44 percent of the women had arrived at what [Spitzer] called good heterosexual functioning," defined as "being in a sustained, loving heterosexual relationship within the past year, getting enough satisfaction from the emotional relationship with their partner to rate at least seven on a 10-point scale, having satisfying heterosexual sex at least monthly and never or rarely thinking of somebody of the same sex during heterosexual sex."

Spitzer also found that "89 percent of men and 95 percent of women said they were bothered only slightly, or not at all, by unwanted homosexual feelings" but that "only 11 percent of the men and 37 percent of the women reported a complete absence of homosexual indicators, including same-sex attraction. [...] Some 43 percent of the sample had been referred to Spitzer by 'ex-gay ministries. [...] An additional 23 percent were referred by the National Association for Research and Therapy of Homosexuality." Spitzer has stated that his research "shows some people can change from gay to straight, and we ought to acknowledge that." Considering how difficult it had been to find 200 participants, and that they were considered the best cases of conversion therapy, Spitzer concluded that although change could occur, it was probably very rare.

The APA issued an official disavowal of Spitzer's paper, noting that it had not been peer-reviewed and stating, "There is no published scientific evidence supporting the efficacy of reparative therapy as a treatment to change one's sexual orientation." Two years later, Spitzer's paper was published in the Archives of Sexual Behavior.

Two thirds of the reviews were critical, and the publication decision sparked controversy, with one member of the publication's supporting organization resigning in protest. The paper has been criticized for its sampling methods and criteria for success.

In a 2005 interview, Spitzer stated, "Many colleagues were outraged" following the publication of the study. Spitzer added, "Within the gay community, there was initially tremendous anger and feeling that I had betrayed them." When asked whether he would consider a follow-up study, Spitzer said no and added that he felt "a little battle fatigue." While Spitzer has said that he has no way of knowing whether the study participants were being honest, he has also indicated that he believed that the interviewees were being candid with him.

In a 2012 interview, Spitzer said he asked to retract the study and stated that he agreed with its critics:

"In retrospect, I have to admit I think the critiques are largely correct," he said. "The findings can be considered evidence for what those who have undergone ex-gay therapy say about it, but nothing more." He said he spoke with the editor of the Archives of Sexual Behavior about writing a retraction, but the editor declined. (Repeated attempts to contact the journal went unanswered.)

— Gabriel Arana, My So-Called Ex-Gay Life

In a letter to Kenneth J Zucker, editor of Journal of Sexual Behavior, Spitzer wrote:

Several months ago I told you that because of my revised view of my 2001 study of reparative therapy changing sexual orientation, I was considering writing something that would acknowledge that I now judged the major critiques of the study as largely correct. After discussing my revised view of the study with Gabriel Arana, a reporter for American Prospect, and with Malcolm Ritter, an Associated Press science writer, I decided that I had to make public my current thinking about the study. Here it is.

Basic Research Question. From the beginning it was: "can some version of reparative therapy enable individuals to change their sexual orientation from homosexual to heterosexual?" Realizing that the study design made it impossible to answer this question, I suggested that the study could be viewed as answering the question, "how do individuals undergoing reparative therapy describe changes in sexual orientation?" – a not very interesting question.

The Fatal Flaw in the Study – There was no way to judge the credibility of subject reports of change in sexual orientation. I offered several (unconvincing) reasons why it was reasonable to assume that the subject's reports of change were credible and not self-deception or outright lying. But the simple fact is that there was no way to determine if the subject's accounts of change were valid.

I believe I owe the gay community an apology for my study making unproven claims of the efficacy of reparative therapy. I also apologize to any gay person who wasted time and energy undergoing some form of reparative therapy because they believed that I had proven that reparative therapy works with some "highly motivated" individuals.

== Awards ==
Spitzer received the Thomas William Salmon Medal from the New York Academy of Medicine for his contributions to psychiatry. The American Psychological Association awarded him in 1987 with the Adolf Meyer award and in 1994 for Research in Psychiatry.

== Personal life and death ==
Spitzer was married three times, his first two marriages ending in divorce. He was born Jewish but held atheist views. He moved from Princeton, New Jersey to Seattle, Washington, in 2015.

Spitzer died from heart disease at a care facility in Seattle on December 25, 2015, at the age of 83. Besides his wife and collaborator, Janet Williams, he was survived by his five children (Gideon Spitzer-Williams, Ezra Spitzer-Williams, Noah Spitzer-Williams, Daniel Spitzer and Laura Spitzer), and five grandchildren.

== Books ==
- Critical Issues in Psychiatric Diagnosis (with Donald F. Klein), Raven, 1978. ISBN 0-89004-213-6
- DSM III Casebook, American Psychiatric Publications, 1981. ISBN 0-89042-051-3
- Treatment of Mental Disorders (with James W. Jefferson), Oxford University Press, 1982. ISBN 0-19-503107-5
- Psychopathology, a Case Book (with Janet B. W. Williams and Andrew E. Skodol), McGraw-Hill, 1983. ISBN 0-07-060350-2
- DSM-III Case Book (Diagnostic), Cambridge University Press, 1985. ISBN 0-521-31530-1
- SCID-P, 'An structured clinical interview for DSM diagnosis, case version', 1986
- APA: Desk Reference to DSM-III R (Diagnostic), Cambridge University Press, 1987. ISBN 0-521-34693-2
- An Annotated Bibliography of DSM-III, 1987. ISBN 0-88048-257-5
- Structured Clinical Interview for DSM-III Axis I Disorders, Research Version, Patient Edition (SCID-I/P), 1990. ISBN 0-88048-411-X
- DSM-IV Casebook: A Learning Companion to the Diagnostic and Statistical Manual of Mental Disorders, 1994. ISBN 0-88048-675-9
- Structured Clinical Interview for DSM-IV Axis I Disorders (SCID-I), 1997. ISBN 0-88048-931-6
- International Perspectives on DSM-III, Diagnostic and Statistical Manual of Mental Disorders, American Psychiatric Association, 1998. ISBN 0-88048-017-3
- DSM-IV-TR Casebook: A Learning Companion to the Diagnostic and Statistical Manual of Mental Disorders, American Psychiatric Association, 2002. ISBN 1-58562-058-0
- Treatment Companion to the DSM-IV-TR Casebook, American Psychiatric Association, 2004. ISBN 1-58562-139-0
- DSM-IV-TR Casebook, Volume 2, American Psychiatric Association, 2006. ISBN 1-58562-219-2
