= National Health Interview Survey =

Health survey in the United States

The National Health Interview Survey (NHIS) is an annual, cross-sectional survey intended to provide nationally representative estimates on a wide range of health status and utilization measures among the nonmilitary, noninstitutionalized population of the United States. Each annual data set can be used to examine the disease burden and access to care that individuals and families are currently experiencing in the United States.

NHIS is designed by the CDC's National Center for Health Statistics (NCHS) – the government agency tasked to monitor the population's health status and behavior – and administered by the U.S. Census Bureau. NHIS has been administered since 1957, although the core content and questionnaires undergo major revisions every 10–15 years. NHIS allows both governmental and outside researchers to obtain estimates on a variety of health-related topics among either the entire nation or specific demographic groups of the population. Also, since the survey design is cross-sectional rather than longitudinal, health information can be trended for demographic groups and the country as a whole, but not for individuals or families.

== History ==
Authorized by the National Health Survey Act of 1956, the U.S. Public Health Service was tasked with implementing an annual survey to collect information on morbidities – physical or mental conditions related to any illness or injury – and medical service and medical facility utilization. The most recent re-design of the survey questionnaire was implemented in 1997.

== Research topics ==
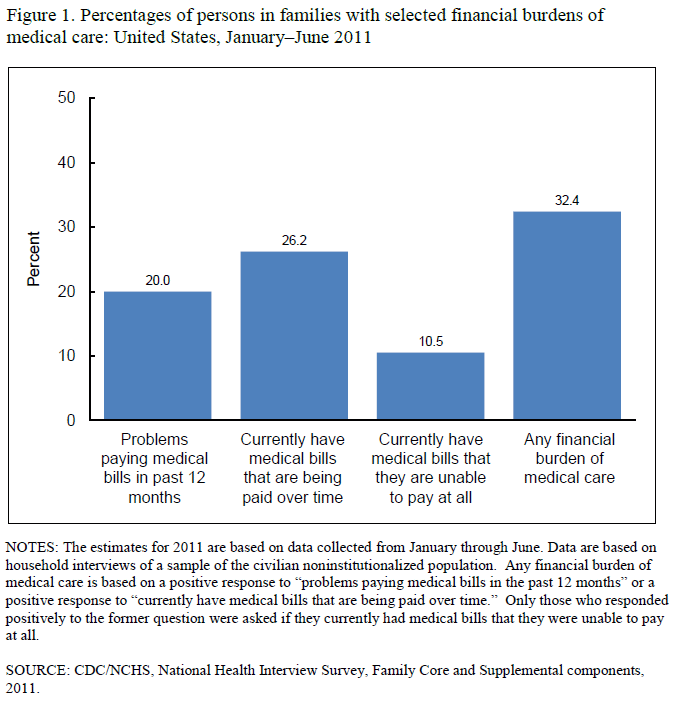
Percentages of persons in families with selected financial burdens of medical care: United States, January–June 2011. Chart from "Financial Burden of Medical Care: Early Release of Estimates From the National Health Interview Survey".

NHIS data contain information on health, influences on health, and health outcomes, as well as common demographic indicators to give users the ability to examine health status, behavior, and risk factors within and across subsets of the population (such as racial and ethnic health disparities).

The major health topics covered in the Core questionnaires include health status, insurance coverage, complementary and alternative medicine, use of health services, immunizations, health behaviors, injuries, occupational health, cancer screening, ability to perform daily activities, and conditions such as asthma, diabetes, mental health. NCHS continually produces chart books, statistical briefs, and fact sheets using NHIS data which shed light on these various facets of morbidities and how the American populace behaves in response.

Periodically, the NHIS includes supplemental questionnaires regarding a focused topic that might be of particular current interest. For example, a cancer supplement was fielded in 1987, 1992, 2000, 2003, 2005, 2008, and 2010, and sponsored by the National Cancer Institute and the National Center for Chronic Disease Prevention. This supplement included questions about cancer screenings, diet, exercise, smoking, sun exposure, and family history.

Occupational supplement were fielded in 2010 and 2015, and sponsored by the National Institute for Occupational Safety and Health (NIOSH). These supplement included questions about work-related health conditions, work organization factors, and occupational psychosocial and physical/chemical exposures.

== Publications ==
The National Health Interview Survey is commonly the subject of analysis in articles on health status and health behaviors in research journals such as Obesity, Journal of the American Dietetic Association, Health Services Research, and the American Journal of Public Health.

A number of CDC reports, including Healthy People, rely on NHIS to monitor health estimates.

The Department of Health and Human Services (HHS), Office of the Assistant Secretary for Planning and Evaluation (ASPE) tracks health insurance coverage in the United States using the NHIS.

The National Center for Health Statistics publishes periodical statistical summaries, compiling the results of the most recent NHIS and trending those statistics over time for certain groups.

NCHS/CDC also publish statistical reports on current topics of interest, and shorter data briefs. For example, NIOSH has published several peer-reviewed journal articles from the 2010 and 2015 NHIS Occupational Health Supplement results.

== Methodology ==
=== Survey design ===
Noninstitutional civilian Americans (both citizens and non-citizens) are sampled by household, allowing for analysis of medical behavior at the familial-level. After a household has been sampled, one adult and one child (if any are present) is selected to complete the Sample Adult and Sample Child components of the survey. In years without budget cuts, approximately 35,000 households containing 87,500 individuals are included.

NHIS follows a multi-stage area probability design, meaning that geographic areas – rather than unique households – are sampled first, and then within those selected areas, residences are sampled. Unlike surveys with a panel or longitudinal design, the entirety of data collected from each household occurs from a single interview lasting about an hour.

The complex survey design must be analyzed with software capable of handling survey data that was not obtained from a simple random sample, such as R, SUDAAN, SAS, Stata, SPSS, and VPLX. In addition to appropriately weighting households that might have been over-represented in the raw data (due to oversampling of populations of interest), survey analysis packages are needed to employ the Taylor-series linearization technique to correctly calculate the standard errors and confidence intervals.

=== Linkage to other health surveys ===
The Medical Expenditure Panel Survey currently uses the NHIS sampled population to form its own sampling frame (ultimately sampling one-half of NHIS respondent households for its own publicly available complete survey). After filling out a confidentiality agreement, AHRQ provides a crosswalk to merge these data.

NHIS data can also be linked to death certificates in the National Death Index (NDI).

== Data Available ==
NHIS data are freely downloadable by the public, and generally become available in June or July for the preceding year's data set. Certain variables that might make survey respondents easily identifiable (such as geographic locations, exact dates of events and procedures) are not available from the publicly available data, but can be accessed and analyzed by applying for access to the NCHS Research Data Center.

The current publicly available annual National Health Interview Survey data release consists of four files which describe the demographics and health-related characteristics of the survey population at the household, family, and person-level, as well as two files designed to capture information on any injuries experienced during the year.

=== Core ===
==== Household File ====
With one record per household in the sample, this file mainly contains descriptors necessary to determine the number of individuals and families within each sampled household, and allows researchers to link families or other unrelated individuals captured in any of the other Core files based on household of residence (using the HHX variable). This file also contains basic information on non-response and a household-level final weight.

==== Family File ====
This file contains one record per family in the sample, with general information on identifiers (such as family member age, race, family structure, family income), health status and limitations, injuries and poisonings, access to care and utilization, and health insurance. The family file can be linked to other files containing information on adults and children within each family (using the HHX and FMX variables).

==== Person File ====
This file contains information on every individual within every family within every household selected for participation in the NHIS. Survey data about individuals who were either not available at the time of the interview or under 18 were provided by an available adult in the household. This person-level file contains information on health status and limitation of activity, health care access and utilization, health insurance, socio-demographics, and income and assets. Examining this file using the final weight variable (WTFA) generalizes to the entire noninstitutional, civilian United States population.

==== Sample Adult and Sample Child Files ====
These two files contain information obtained from the survey response of one adult and one child (if one exists) sampled from each family contained in the family file, and can be linked up to household and family information (using the HHX and FMX variables). These two sample person files contain much more in-depth information about health conditions, physical and mental health status, health limitations, behaviors, and utilization than the family file. Their question topics are specific to either adults or children, but not both (such as occupational demographic questions in the adult file and childhood immunization questions in the child file).

Much like the Person file, these two files can be used to create national estimates of all adults and children in the United States (using WTFA_SA to generalize to all adults and WTFA_SC to generalize to all children). Individuals can be matched between the Person and Sample Adult/Child files using the HHX (household), FMX (family), and FPX (person) fields.

==== Injury and Poisoning Files ====
The Injury and Poisoning Episode file contains event-level information about any injury event experienced by an individual within the household in the three months leading up to the interview. For each reported injury or poisoning event, a number of questions examining the severity and effect of the event were asked, such as whether a physician was consulted and what kind of injury was experienced. This episode file can be used to generalize about the frequency of all injuries experienced by Americans over a defined window of time. The final weight (WTFA) generalizes to the number of injuries that occur among the U.S. population. This file can be merged on to any of the other data files using the HHX (household), FMX (family), and FPX (person) merge fields.

The Injury and Poisoning Verbatim file contains un-categorized, open-ended data provided by the respondent. This file can be linked to the cleaned Episode file using the HHX, FMX, FPX, and IPEPNO (Injury/Poisoning Episode Number) fields.

=== Supplemental ===
Supplemental data are available whenever funding and sponsorship allow. The topics of non-core questionnaires generally relate to a matter of current importance to policymakers or the research community.

Occupational Health Supplement

In 2010 and 2015, supplemental data were collected that relate to the impacts of work on health. Known as the Occupational Health Supplements, these data are available to chart using the Worker Health Charts tool. Worker Health Charts is a tool NIOSH uses to allow the public to visualize NHIS data, along with other work-related data sources. See the CDC Feature on Worker Health Charts and the NIOSH Science Blog to learn more about the tool and how it works.

== See also ==
- List of household surveys in the United States
