= Medically unexplained physical symptoms =

Symptoms with no known or agreed upon cause

Medically unexplained physical symptoms (MUPS or MUS) are symptoms for which a treating physician or other healthcare providers have found no medical cause, or whose cause remains contested. In its strictest sense, the term simply means that the cause for the symptoms is unknown or disputed—there is no scientific consensus. Not all medically unexplained symptoms are influenced by identifiable psychological factors. However, in practice, most physicians and authors who use the term consider that the symptoms most likely arise from psychological causes. Typically, the possibility that MUPS are caused by prescription drugs or other drugs is ignored.

== Prevalence ==
It is estimated that between 15% and 30% of all primary care consultations are for medically unexplained symptoms. About 1 in 4 people who see a UK GP have physical symptoms that cannot be explained.

Women are significantly more likely than men to be diagnosed with Medically Unexplained Symptoms.

== Symptoms ==
A large Canadian community survey revealed that the most common medically unexplained symptoms are musculoskeletal pain, ear, nose, and throat symptoms, abdominal pain and gastrointestinal symptoms, fatigue, and dizziness. Other medically unexplained symptoms are headaches, feeling faint, heart palpitations, fits (seizures), breathlessness, weakness and paralysis, and numbness and tingling.

== Definition and terminology ==
The term MUPS can be used to refer to syndromes whose etiology remains unclear or contested, including chronic fatigue syndrome, fibromyalgia, multiple chemical sensitivity and Gulf War illness. Pathogenesis may be suspected.

The term medically unexplained symptoms is in some cases treated as synonymous to older terms such as psychosomatic symptoms, conversion disorders, somatic symptoms, somatisations or somatoform disorders; as well as contemporary terms such as functional disorders, bodily distress, and persistent physical symptoms. The plethora of terms reflects imprecision and uncertainty in their definition, controversy, and care taken to avoid stigmatising affected people.

=== Related terms ===
Functional somatic syndrome refers to disturbances in bodily functioning where aetiology is unknown, including that psychogenesis is not assumed.

"Persistent physical symptoms" includes situations where persistent physical symptoms are caused by a known illness, such as arthritis.

In somatic symptom disorder chronic physical symptoms, which may or may not be linked to a known illness, coincide with excessive and maladaptive thoughts, emotions, and behaviors connected to those symptoms.

== Risk factors ==
Risk factors for medically unexplained symptoms are complex and include both psychological and organic features, and such symptoms are often accompanied by other somatic symptoms attributable to organic disease. As such it is recognised that the boundary defining symptoms as medically unexplained is blurred.

Childhood adversity and/or abuse, and the death or serious illness of a close family member are significant risk factors.

Many patients presenting with medically unexplained symptoms also meet the diagnostic criteria for anxiety and/or depression. The likelihood of meeting such criteria increases with the number of unexplained symptoms reported. However, anxiety and depression are also very common in individuals with medically explained illnesses, and again, the likelihood of a person receiving one of these diagnoses increases with the number of symptoms reported.

Physical symptoms have been associated with adverse psychosocial and functional outcome across different cultures, irrespective of etiology (either explained or unexplained).

== Doctor-patient relations ==
The lack of known etiology in MUPS cases can lead to conflict between patient and health-care provider over the diagnosis and treatment of MUPS. Most physicians will consider that MUPS most probably have a psychological cause (even if the patient displays no evidence of psychological problems). Many patients, on the other hand, reject the implication that their problems are "all in their head", and feel their symptoms have a physical cause. Diagnosis of MUPS is seldom a satisfactory situation for the patient, and can lead to an adversarial doctor-patient relationship. The situation may lead a patient to question the doctor's competence.

A 2008 review in the British Medical Journal stated that a doctor must be careful not to tell a patient that nothing is wrong, "as clearly this is not the case". The symptoms that brought the patient to the doctor are real, even when the cause is not known. The doctor should try to explain the symptoms, avoid blaming the patient for them, and work with the patient to develop a symptom management plan.

== Evaluation ==
When a cause for MUPS is found, the symptom(s) are no longer medically unexplained. Some cases of ulcers and dyspepsia were considered MUPS until bacterial infections were found to be their cause. Similarly, in illnesses where long diagnostic delays are common (e.g., certain types of autoimmune disease and other rare illnesses), the patients' symptoms are classifiable as MUPS right up until the point where a formal diagnosis is made (which, in some instances, can take upwards of five years). Even when a person has received a confirmed medical disease diagnosis, they may nonetheless be considered to have MUPS, if they present with symptoms that are either not fully explained by their disease diagnosis, or are considered by the physician to be more severe than would be predicted by their disease. For example, severe fatigue in patients with systemic lupus erythematosus (SLE) has been interpreted as MUPS because the fatigue cannot be clearly linked to any of the known biological markers for SLE.

== Treatment ==
Cognitive behavioral therapy

The most effective current treatment for some medically unexplained symptoms is a combination of therapeutic approaches tailored to the individual patient. Most MUS patients are in need of psychotherapy, relaxation therapy and physiotherapy under medical supervision. A combined therapeutic approach which is at least twice as effective as other therapeutic modalities published to date is described in Steele RE et al. "A novel and effective treatment modality for medically unexplained symptoms". The next best documented approach is cognitive behavioral therapy (CBT), with evidence from multiple randomized controlled trials. Antidepressants may also help, but the evidence is "not yet conclusive." The effectiveness of CBT and antidepressants has not been studied for all medically unexplained symptoms, however. Evidence for a positive effect of CBT has been found in trials for fibromyalgia, chronic fatigue syndrome, irritable bowel syndrome, unexplained headaches, unexplained back pain, tinnitus, and non-cardiac chest pain. Overall, CBT has been shown to be effective in reducing psychological distress and improving medical status in MUPS patients. However the quality of many CBT studies remains low, and many studies lack an attention-placebo control. As of 2006, CBT had not been tested for menopausal syndrome, chronic facial pain, interstitial cystitis, or chronic pelvic pain.

Some high quality studies have been conducted examining the effectiveness of antidepressants in MUPS. Those antidepressants that have been investigated include tricyclic antidepressants (TCAs) and selective serotonin reuptake inhibitors (SSRIs). For example, TCAs have effects on IBS, fibromyalgia, back pain, headaches, and possibly tinnitus, and single studies show a possible effect in chronic facial pain, non-cardiac chest pain, and interstitial cystitis. SSRIs are usually not effective or have only a weak effect. One exception is menopausal syndrome, where SSRIs are "possibly effective" as well as a third class of antidepressants, the serotonin-norepinephrine reuptake inhibitors (SNRIs).

A 2010 Cochrane review examined the use of Consultation Letters for MUPS with psychiatrist and found some evidence of their effectiveness in terms of medical cost and patient physical functioning. The studies reviewed were small and of moderate quality and completed primarily in the United States so generalizing results to other settings should be done with caution.

=== Theories ===
There is no consensus as to what causes MUPS. However, a number of theories have been put forward. Many of these share the common assumption that MUPS are somehow caused by psychological distress or disturbance. One classical theory is that MUPS arise as a reaction to childhood trauma in vulnerable individuals. More contemporary theories place less emphasis on trauma and suggest that an individual's personality and psychological characteristics play a central role. For example, it has been suggested that people who have anxiety or depression or who focus excessively on their body might be particularly prone to these symptoms.

For certain MUPSs that occur within recognized syndromes (e.g. chronic fatigue syndrome and fibromyalgia), there is wide disagreement across disciplines as to the causes of the symptoms. Research in the domains of psychology and psychiatry frequently emphasizes psychological causal factors, whereas research in the biomedical sciences – relating to immunology and rheumatology, for example – commonly emphasizes biological factors.

== See also ==
- Amplified musculoskeletal pain syndrome
- Cryptogenic disease
- Culture-bound syndrome
- Diagnosis of exclusion
- Functional disorder
- Idiopathy
- Idiosyncratic drug reaction
- Somatoform disorders
