= Somatic Symptom Scale – 8 =

Medical questionnaire

The Somatic Symptom Scale – 8 (SSS-8) is a brief self-report questionnaire used to assess somatic symptom burden. It measures the perceived burden of common somatic symptoms. These symptoms were originally chosen to reflect common symptoms in primary care but they are relevant for a large number of diseases and mental disorders. The SSS-8 is a brief version of the popular Patient Health Questionnaire – 15 (PHQ-15).

== The questionnaire ==
Respondents rate how much they were bothered by common somatic symptoms within the last seven days on a five-point Likert scale. Ratings are summed up to make a simple sum score (which can vary between 0 and 32 points). The SSS-8 includes the following symptoms:

- Stomach or bowel problems
- Back pain
- Pain in your arms, legs, or joints
- Headaches
- Chest pain or shortness of breath
- Dizziness
- Feeling tired or having low energy
- Trouble sleeping

SSS-8 English version

SSS-8 German version

SSS-8 Japanese version

== Development ==
The SSS-8 is a short version of the frequently used and well-validated Patient Health Questionnaire – 15 (PHQ-15). The SSS-8 was designed to be used in settings with restricted measurement time. The items from the PHQ-15 which were included in the SSS-8 were selected according to three criteria: Symptom prevalence in primary care settings, associations with measures of functioning and health related quality of life, and commonalities with other items included in the scale.

== Psychometric properties ==
Psychometric properties were examined in a representative German general population sample (sample size N = 2510, age > 13 years, year 2012).

=== Reliability ===
Internal consistency is demonstrated by Cronbach's α = 0.81.

=== Validity ===
==== Content validity ====
The content validity is supposed to be high because the items are derived from the well-validated PHQ-15. In addition, Zijlema et al. (2013) reviewed 99 scientific publications which presented 40 instruments designed to assess somatic symptoms, somatization, or medically unexplained symptoms. They conclude that a valid measure of somatic symptom burden should include items about "cardiopulmonary (including autonomic symptoms), gastrointestinal, musculoskeletal, and general symptoms". The SSS-8 includes items from all four domains.

==== Construct validity ====
The SSS-8 showed positive associations with measures of depression and anxiety. This is consistent with previous studies that demonstrated high co-morbidity of somatic, depressive, and anxious symptoms (i.e. the somatization-anxiety-depression triad). Moreover, high SSS-8 scores were associated with poor self-reported general well-being and frequent health care use.

==== Factorial validity ====
The SSS-8 has a higher order general factor structure. It consists of a general factor and four lower order facets (gastrointestinal symptoms, pain, cardiopulmonary symptoms, and fatigue). This factor structure is invariant for age and gender.

=== Objectivity ===
The instrument is straightforward to complete, has an easy scoring algorithm (addition of the responses), and has two simple interpretation methods (i.e. severity categories and gender and age specific percentiles). Given this, the objectivity of the instrument is supposed to be high.

=== Sensitivity to change ===
In a sample of patients with mental disorders who received evidence based treatment, Gierk et al. 2017 showed that the SSS-8 is sensitive to change. A decrease of 3 points reflected a minimal clinically important difference.

== Interpretation and normative data ==
Severity categories:

Score	Severity
0–3	No to minimal
4–7	Low
8–11	Medium
12–15	High
16–32	Very high

Furthermore, Gierk et al. (2014) published gender and age specific percentiles from the German general population. The sample included respondents who were older than 13 years.

== Comparison of the SSS-8 and the PHQ-15 ==
Gierk et al. (2015) compared the psychometric properties of the SSS-8 and the PHQ-15 in a sample of 131 psychosomatic patients. The sum scores of both questionnaires showed a very high correlation (r = 0.83). The internal consistency was comparable (SSS-8 Cronbach's α = 0.76 vs. PHQ-15 Cronbach's α = 0.80). Moreover, they found a similar pattern of correlations with measures of depression, anxiety, health anxiety, health related quality of life, and health care use. However, poor agreement was found for the severity classifications (the SSS-8 uses five severity categories whereas the PHQ-15 uses only four). The authors note that the severity classification needs "further evaluation in other populations". Overall, they conclude that "the SSS-8 performed well as a short version of the PHQ-15 which makes it preferable for assessment in time restricted settings."

== Translations ==
The original SSS-8 was published in English. Many psychometrically validated and culturally adapted translations are available:

- German
- Japanese
- Brazilian Portuguese
- Chinese
- Greek
- Korean
- Persian
- Indonesian
- Mongolian
