= Andrew E. Skodol =

American psychiatrist

- Education: Yale university University of Pennsylvania
- Occupation: Professor of psychiatry

Andrew E. Skodol is a professor of psychiatry at the University of Arizona and Columbia University. Skodol is a member of the American Psychiatric Association, American College of Psychiatrists, and the World Psychiatric Association. He was also the President of the Association for Research on Personality Disorders and, in 2017, the American Psychopathological Association.

He graduated from Yale University and the University of Pennsylvania. Skodol received his psychiatric training at the Albert Einstein College of Medicine, where he worked as an assistant professor until 1979, when he transferred to Columbia. Becoming a professor of Clinical Psychiatry from 1995 to 2007. From 2000 to 2003 he was the deputy director of the New York State Psychiatric Institute. From 2007 to 2008 he was the president of the Institute for Mental Health Research, and from 2008 to 2011 he helmed the Sunbelt Collaborative.

== Work on personality disorders ==
Skodol helped write the fifth edition (DSM-5) of the Diagnostic and Statistical Manual of Mental Disorders, and served as the chair for its work group on personality and personality disorders. While writing the DSM-5 he argued for the removal of narcissistic personality disorder. He is also the chair of the Collaborative Longitudinal Personality Disorders Study. With his research primarily focused on diagnosis, stress and psychosocial functioning, borderline personality disorder, avoidant personality disorder, major depressive disorder, schizotypal personality disorder, schizophrenia, and personality disorders. Skodol also worked to identify differing levels of severity amongst personality disorders, new personality disorder traits, new types of personality disorders, and new general personality disorder criteria.
