= Patient Health Questionnaire =

Multiple-choice questionnaire used to screen for mental disorders

- Synonyms: PHQ
- LOINC: 69723-5

Complete version PHQ-D with GAD-7 (in German)

The Patient Health Questionnaire (PHQ) is a multiple-choice self-report inventory that is used as a screening and diagnostic tool for mental health disorders of depression, anxiety, alcohol, eating, and somatoform disorders. It is the self-report version of the Primary Care Evaluation of Mental Disorders (PRIME-MD), a diagnostic tool developed in the mid-1990s by Pfizer. The length of the original assessment limited its feasibility; consequently, a shorter version, consisting of 11 multi-part questions – the Patient Health Questionnaire was developed and validated.

In addition to the PHQ, a nine-item version to assess symptoms of depression, a seven-item version to assess symptoms of anxiety (GAD-7) and a 15-item version to detect somatic symptoms (PHQ-15), have been developed and validated. The PHQ-9, GAD-7, and the PHQ-15 were combined to create the PHQ-somatic, anxiety, depressive symptoms (PHQ-SADS) and includes questions regarding panic attacks (after the GAD-7 section). Though less commonly used, there are also brief versions of the PHQ-9 and GAD-7 that may be useful as screening tools in some settings. In recent years, the PHQ-9 has been validated for use in adolescents, and a version for adolescents was also developed and validated (PHQ-A). Although these tests were originally designed as self-report inventories they can also be administered by trained health care practitioners.

The PHQ is available in over 20 languages, available on the PHQ website. Both the original Patient Health Questionnaire and later variants are public domain resources; no fees or permissions are required for using or copying the measures. Additionally, the measures have been validated in a number of different populations internationally.

== Versions ==
The original Patient Health Questionnaire contains five modules; these contain questions about depressive, anxiety, somatoform, alcohol, and eating disorders. Designed for use in the primary care setting, it lacks coverage for disorders seen in psychiatric settings. Some modules are used independently, and variants have been developed based on the original items.

=== 9-item depression scale ===
The PHQ-9 (DEP-9 in some sources), a tool specific to depression, scores each of the 9 DSM-IV related criteria based on the mood module from the original PRIME-MD. The PHQ-9 is both sensitive and specific in its diagnoses, which has led to its prominence in the primary care setting. This tool is used in a variety of different contexts, including clinical settings across the United States as well as research studies.

One study which used the PHQ-9, examined if college student displays of depression symptoms on Facebook were representative of offline symptoms. Results demonstrated that those who displayed depression symptoms on Facebook scored higher on the PHQ-9, suggesting that those who display depression symptoms on Facebook are experiencing them offline.

=== 2-item depression screener ===
Patient Health Questionnaire 2 item
- Synonyms: PHQ-2
- LOINC: 55757-9

The Patient Health Questionnaire 2 item (PHQ-2) is an ultra-brief screening instrument containing the first two questions from the PHQ-9. Two screening questions to assess the presence of a depressed mood and a loss of interest or pleasure in routine activities, and a positive response to either question indicates further testing is required. This version of the PHQ has been shown to have good diagnostic sensitivity but poor specificity.

=== 4-item depression and anxiety screener ===
Patient Health Questionnaire 4 item
- Synonyms: PHQ-4
- LOINC: 69724-3

The Patient Health Questionnaire 4 item (PHQ-4) combines the PHQ-2 with the Generalized Anxiety Disorder 2 (GAD-2), an ultra-brief anxiety screener containing the first two questions from the Generalized Anxiety Disorder 7 (GAD-7).

=== 15-item somatic scale ===
Patient Health Questionnaire 15 item
- Synonyms: PHQ-15, PHQ Somatic Symptom Scale
- LOINC: 69728-4

The Patient Health Questionnaire 15 item (PHQ-15) contains the PHQ's somatic symptom scale. It is a well-validated measure, which asks whether symptoms are present and about their severity. A brief version, the Somatic Symptom Scale – 8, was derived from PHQ-15. The development of the PHQ-15 helped address three main problems in the assessment and diagnosis of somatoform disorders. Firstly, traditional methods of diagnosing somatoform disorders would only capture about 20% of true cases due to the number of symptoms required to meet a diagnosis. Secondly, in order to attain more reliable and valid data, assessments need to address more current rather than previous symptoms. Thirdly, continuing to adhere to the "medically unexplained" requirement for symptoms makes it very difficult to make a diagnosis because it is extremely hard to ascertain if a symptom is or is not part of a larger medical condition (e.g. chronic fatigue and depression).

=== 7-item anxiety scale ===
The GAD-7 is a 7-item scale designed to assess symptoms of anxiety. Each item is scored on a 0-to-3 point scale ("not at all" to "nearly every day"). Cut points of 5, 10, and 15 correspond to mild, moderate, and severe anxiety.

=== 8-item depression scale ===
The PHQ-8 is an eight-item scale developed specifically to screen for depression in American epidemiological populations.

=== Somatic, anxiety, and depressive symptoms ===
Patient Health Questionnaire – Somatic, Anxiety, and Depressive Symptoms
- Synonyms: PHQ-SADS
- LOINC: 69729-2

The Patient Health Questionnaire – Somatic, Anxiety, and Depressive Symptoms (PHQ-SADS) screens for somatic, anxiety, and depressive symptoms using PHQ-9, GAD-7, and PHQ-15, plus the panic symptoms question from the original PHQ.

=== Adolescent scale ===
The PHQ-A is a four module self-report to evaluate depression, anxiety, substance use and eating disorders in adolescent primary care patients.

== Reliability ==
Measure	Criterion	Rating* (adequate, good, excellent, too good)	Explanation
PHQ	Norms	Excellent	Multiple convenience and random samples, as well as research studies in both clinical and nonclinical sample
	Internal consistency (Cronbach's alpha, split half, etc.)	Good	Cronbach's alpha reported at .88 for measuring depression
	Inter-rater reliability	Good	Kappas range from .64 to .81 for depression. Kappa for anxiety is .83
	Test-retest reliability (stability)		No published studies formally checking test-retest reliability
	Repeatability		No published studies formally checking repeatability
PHQ-9	Norms	Excellent	Multiple convenience and random samples, as well as research studies in both clinical and nonclinical samples.
	Internal consistency (Cronbach's alpha, split half, etc.)	Good	Cronbach's alphas range from .83 to .89
	Inter-rater reliability	Good	One study in Nigerian university students with found ranges between .83 and .92
	Test-retest reliability (stability)	Adequate	Correlation between administrations done within 48 hours was .84.
	Repeatability	Not published	No published studies formally checking repeatability.
GAD-7	Norms	Excellent	Multiple convenience and random samples, as well as research studies in both clinical and nonclinical samples
	Internal consistency (Cronbach's alpha, split half, etc.)	Good	Cronbach's alpha reported at .92
	Inter-rater reliability	Good	The interviewer vs. self-rated correlation ranges from .83 and .84
	Test-retest reliability (stability	Good	Reported as .83
	Repeatability	Not published	No published studies formally checking repeatability
PHQ-15	Norms	Excellent	Two large studies with convenience and random samples used. One research studies (N=906) in clinical sample and one research study (N=6000) in nonclinical sample.
	Internal consistency (Cronbach's alpha, split half, etc.)	Good	Cronbach's alpha reported at .80
	Inter-rater reliability		No published studies formally checking inter-rater reliability
	Test-retest reliability (stability)	Good	Kappa = .60 when administration was done within 2 weeks of first test
	Repeatability		No published studies formally checking repeatability.

== Validity ==
Measure	Criterion	Rating* (adequate, good, excellent, too good*)	Explanation with references
PHQ	Content validity	Good	Covers DSM-IV criteria for major depressive disorder, panic disorder, other anxiety disorder, bulimia nervosa, other depressive disorder, probable alcohol abuse or dependence, and somatoform and binge eating disorders
PHQ	Construct validity (e.g., predictive, concurrent, convergent, and discriminant validity)	Adequate	Construct validity has not been fully established, and more substantial evidence of convergent and discriminant validity would be helpful. Validity is consistent with PRIME-MD.
PHQ	Discriminative validity	Excellent	AUCs range from .89 to .92 for detecting depression
PHQ	Validity generalization		No published studies formally checking validity generalization.
PHQ	Treatment sensitivity		No published studies formally checking treatment sensitivity.
PHQ	Clinical utility	Good	The PHQ is free and can be completed independently by the patient; it assesses a wide array of mental health concerns.
PHQ-9	Content validity	Excellent	Covers the DSM-IV criteria for major depressive disorder.
PHQ-9	Construct validity (e.g., predictive, concurrent, convergent, and discriminant validity)	Good	Higher PHQ-9 scores were correlated with greater self-reported disability days, clinic visits, health-care utilization, as well as difficulties in activities and relationships.
PHQ-9	Discriminative validity	Too excellent	An average sensitivity of .77 and specificity of .94 (corresponding to an AUC .94) in primary care settings suggests good discriminative validity in populations that are generally not depressed, but it may not perform as well in clinical populations.
PHQ-9	Validity generalization	Variable	A meta-analysis of 27 samples suggested that performance of the PHQ-9 is highly heterogeneous; pooled sensitivity is low and specificity is high.
PHQ-9	Treatment sensitivity	Good	In a treatment study using three medical outpatient cohorts, the PHQ-9 has been shown to be sensitive to change over time The PHQ-9 has been used in studies to effectively monitor change following cognitive behavioral treatment. A meta analysis stated that the PHQ-9 had good treatment sensitivity.
PHQ-9	Clinical utility	Good	The PHQ-9 is brief, free to use, and easy to score. It has good specificity, but the poor sensitivity could lead to false negatives, which is a problem for a screening tool. It is likely to perform best in samples where the prevalence of depressive disorders is high. To improve clinical utility, meta-analyses suggest increasing cut score to 10 or higher to improve sensitivity.
GAD-7	Content validity	Good	Covers seven of the core symptoms for generalized anxiety disorder.
GAD-7	Construct validity (e.g., predictive, concurrent, convergent, and discriminant validity)	Good	Scores correlate with the Beck Anxiety Inventory (r= .72) and the anxiety subscale of the SCL-90 (r=.74).
GAD-7	Discriminative validity	Too excellent	AUC for detecting generalized anxiety disorder was .91, for panic disorder AUC= .85 for panic disorder, AUC=.83 for social anxiety disorder, and AUC=.83 for PTSD.
GAD-7	Validity generalization	Good	Validity has been established across multiple populations.
GAD-7	Treatment sensitivity	Good	The GAD-7 showed good sensitivity to treatment effects in two randomized-controlled trials.
GAD-7	Clinical utility	Excellent	The GAD-7 is brief, free to use, and easy to score. It is sensitive to change following treatment. There is some evidence that elderly people may require some help to complete the scale accurately.
PHQ-15	Content validity	Good	Scores correspond well to DSM-IV somatoform diagnoses from the SCID and General Health Questionnaire-15.
PHQ-15	Construct validity (e.g., predictive, concurrent, convergent, and discriminant validity)	Adequate	PHQ-15 scores correlated with medically unexplained symptom counts (r=.52) measured via an independent psychiatric review and with the General Health Questionnaire-15.
PHQ-15	Discriminative validity	Excellent	Sensitivity was 78% and specificity was 71% for a DSM-IV diagnosis of somatoform disorder, corresponding to an AUC of .76.
PHQ-15	Validity generalization		Although the PHQ-15 is currently being used in major studies in several European countries and Australia. there is evidence that it does not perform as well in Hispanic populations.
PHQ-15	Treatment sensitivity	Unknown	Meta-analysis states that the treatment sensitivity for the PHQ-15 has not been researched much, but there is some support that the PHQ-15 is sensitive to treatment.
PHQ-15	Clinical utility	Good	The PHQ-15 is easy to use, free, and has a high discriminant and convergent validity, it has also been validated in many different clinical populations.

== Limitations ==
All versions of the PHQ are self reports and, consequently, are subject to inherent biases, including social desirability and poor retrospective recall.

The influence of these biases can be mitigated by following up with a structured or semi-structured interview, the gold standard for diagnostic assessment.

The time period assessed by each scale could also be a limitation; the PHQ-9 asks about the last four weeks, whereas the GAD-7 focuses on the past two weeks, and the PHQ asks about various time periods from the last two weeks to the last six months. Depending on the time period in question, this may or may not require a revision (i.e., if you are interested in depression over the last six months, you might alter the instructions), which could impact the validity of the measure.

The scoring thresholds recommended are influenced by the samples in which they were validated and correspond with different levels of sensitivity and specificity, which may or may not match well with the intended use of the scale.

== See also ==
- Generalized Anxiety Disorder 7 (GAD-7)
- Somatic Symptom Scale - 8 (SSS-8)
