= Tongue disease =

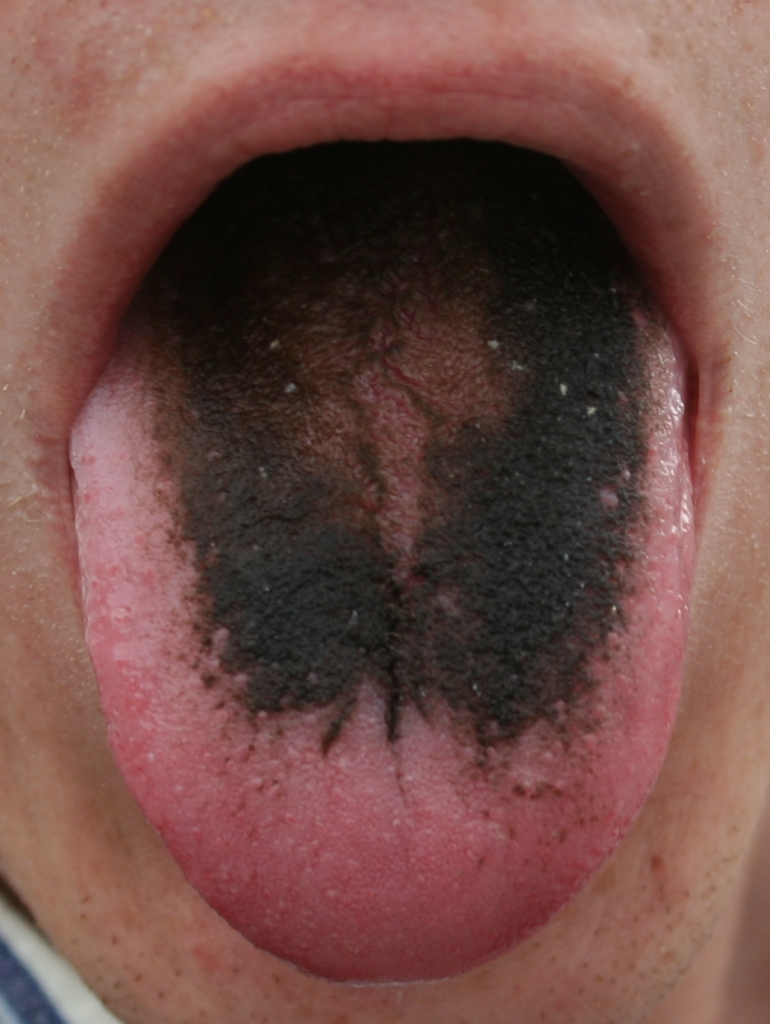
- A picture of black hairy tongue, a non-serious tongue disease.
- Specialty: Gastroenterology

Tongue diseases can be congenital or acquired, and are multiple in number. Considered according to a surgical sieve, some example conditions which can involve the tongue are discussed below. Glossitis is a general term for tongue inflammation, which can have various etiologies, e.g. infection.

== Congenital ==
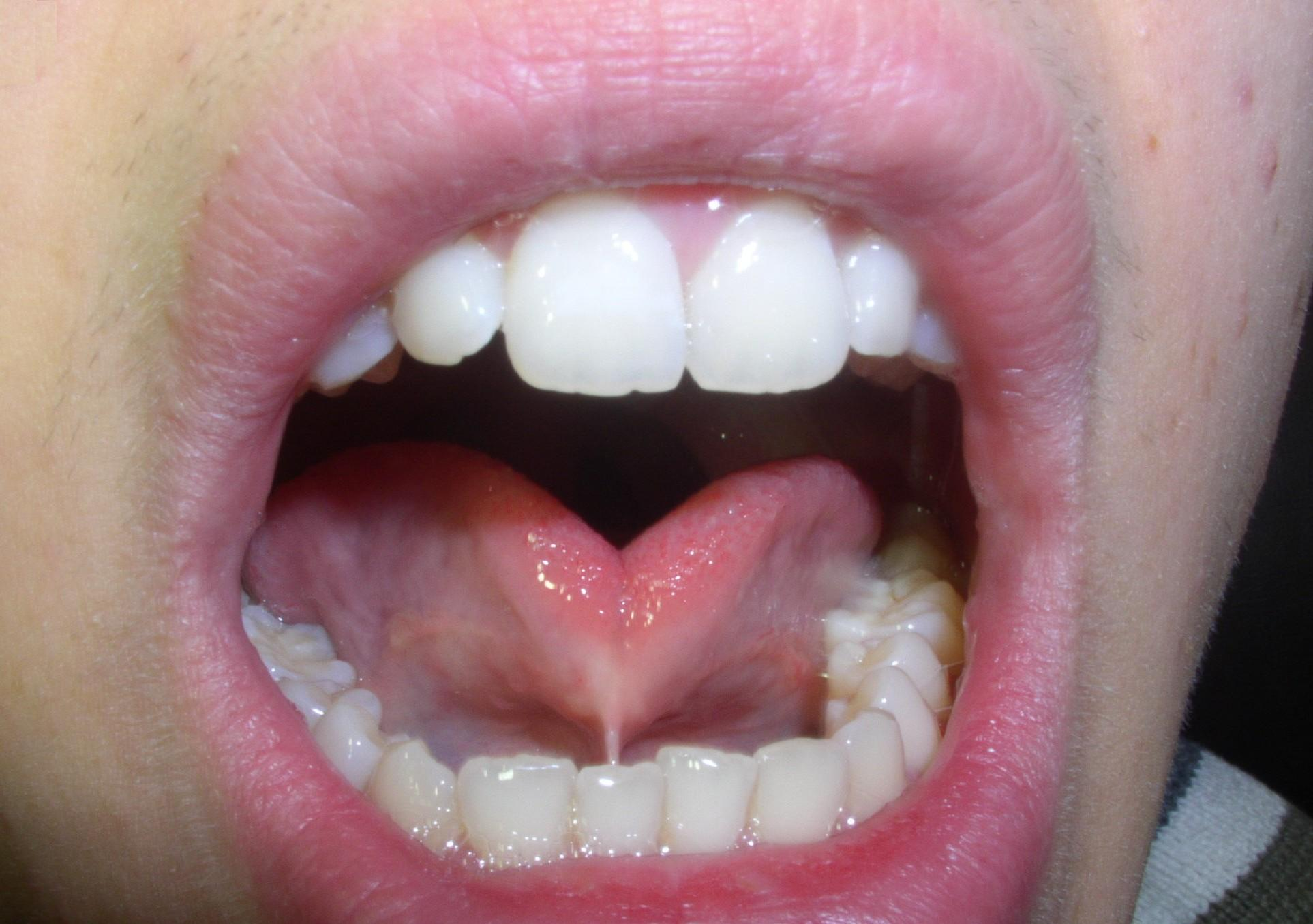
Ankyloglossia

Examples of congenital disorders which affect the tongue include:

- Aglossia - complete absence of the tongue at birth
- Ankyloglossia (tongue tie) - where the lingual frenum tethers the tongue to the floor of the mouth. If it interferes with oral hygiene and feeding, frenectomy may be indicated.
- Hypoglossia - congenitally short tongue
- Microglossia
- Macroglossia - an abnormally large tongue, seen in some disorders such as Down syndrome (although macroglossia can be an acquired condition as well).
- Hamartomata - for example Leiomyomatous hamartoma
- Glossoptosis
- Choristomata - For example, osseous choristoma of the tongue, a very rare condition characterized by a nodule on the dorsum of the tongue containing mature lamellar bone without osteoblastic or osteoclastic activity. Cartilaginous (chondroid), and glial choristomas may also very rarely occur on the tongue.
- Lingual thyroid
- Cleft tongue (bifid tongue) - completely cleft tongue is a rare condition caused by a failure of the lateral lingual swellings to merge. More common is an incompletely cleft tongue, appearing as midline fissure. This is normally classed as fissured tongue.

== Acquired ==
=== Vascular ===
- Caviar tongue - the veins underneath the tongue can become dilated and prominent, giving the undersurface of the tongue a caviar like appearance.
- Hemangioma

=== Infectious ===
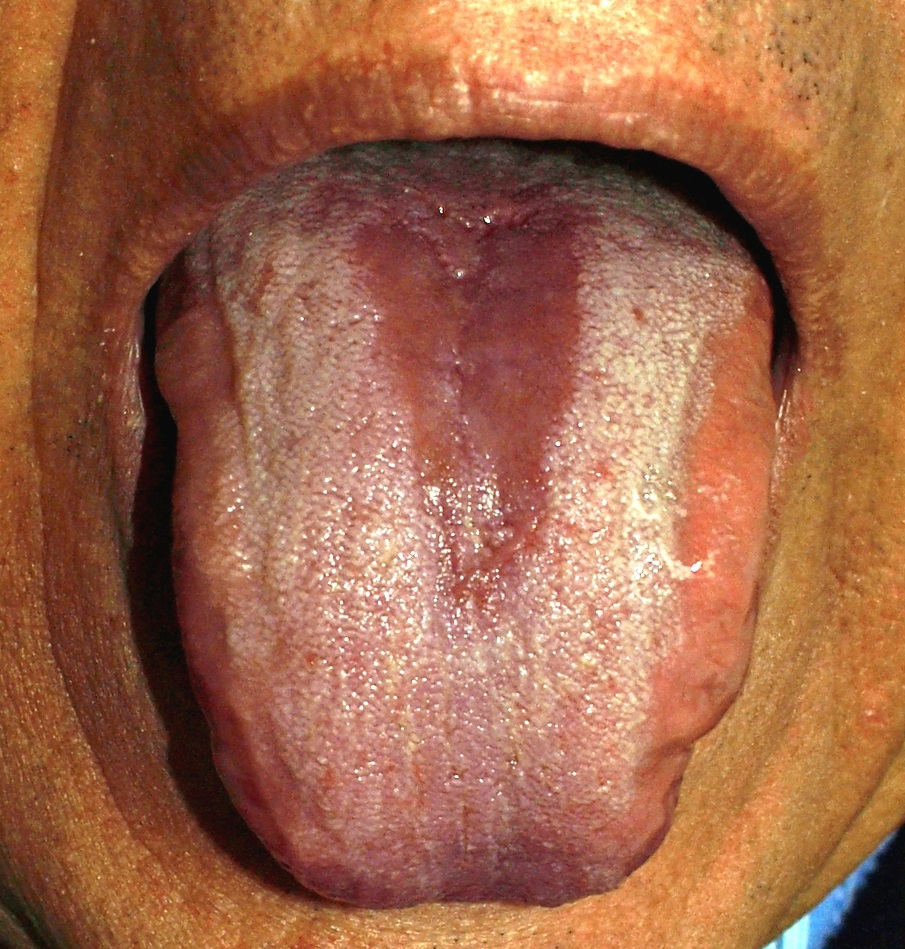
Median rhomboid glossitis

- Glossitis - some types of glossitis are caused by infections, e.g. median rhomboid glossitis (Candida species), "strawberry tongue" (seen in scarlet fever), and syphilitic glossitis (seen in tertiary syphilis).
- Oral hairy leukoplakia (seen in people with immunosuppression, caused by Epstein–Barr virus)
- Oral candidiasis can affect the tongue. Risk factors for oral candidiasis include antibiotic and corticosteroid use, and immunodeficiency (e.g. HIV), or diabetes mellitus).

=== Traumatic ===
- The tongue may traumatized by mechanical, thermal, electrical or chemical means. A common scenario is where the tongue is bitten accidentally whilst a local anesthetic inferior alveolar nerve block is wearing off. The tongue may develop scalloping on the lateral margins, sometimes termed crenated tongue. This appearance is the result of indentations of the teeth where the tongue is habitually pressed against the teeth ("tongue thrusting", and example of oral parafunction). A lesion similar to morsicatio buccarum can occur on the tongue (sometimes called morsicatio linguarum), caused by chronic chewing on the tongue. The ventral surface (under surface) of the tongue may also be traumatized during oral sexual activity such as cunnilingus ("cunnilingus tongue").

=== Autoimmune ===
- Autoimmune conditions such as Sjögren syndrome can cause xerostomia, with resultant glossitis.

=== Inflammatory ===
- Glossitis
- Oral lichen planus

=== Neurological ===
- Hypoglossal nerve weakness can cause atrophy and fasciculation of the tongue.
- Melkersson–Rosenthal syndrome - a neurological disorder characterized by fissured tongue, facial palsy and orofacial swelling.

=== Neoplastic ===
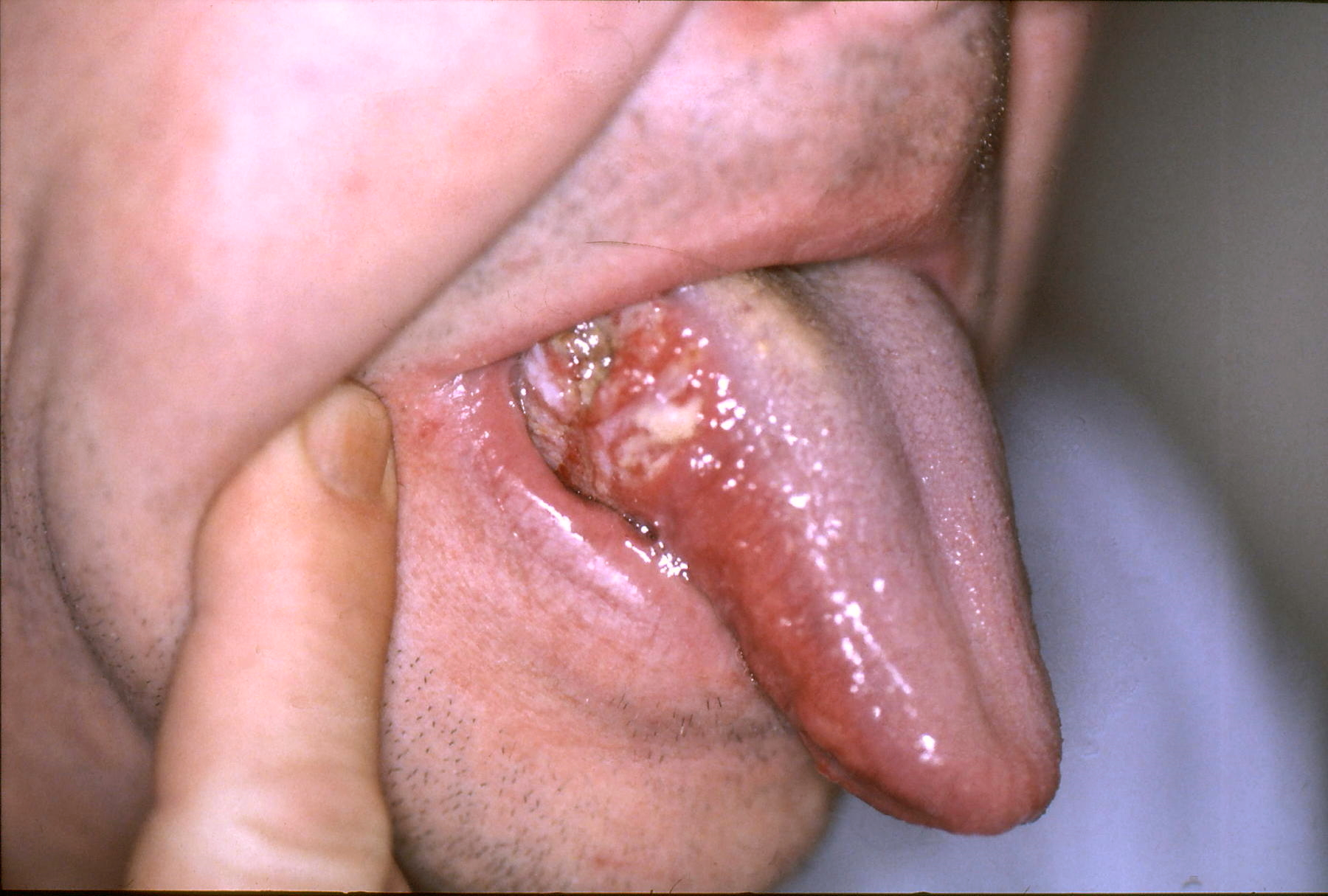
Oral cancer on the side of the tongue

- The sides (lateral) and undersurface (ventral) of the tongue are high risk sites for the development of oral cancer, most commonly squamous cell carcinoma.

=== Degenerative ===
- Motor neuron disease (Lou Gehrig's disease) can cause impaired control of tongue movement, affecting speech and swallowing.

=== Environmental ===
- Poor diet can cause malnutrition and nutritional deficiencies. Deficiency of iron, B vitamins and folic acid are common causes for atrophic glossitis.
- Black hairy tongue - some factors thought to cause black hairy tongue are environmental, such as eating a soft diet, poor oral hygiene, smoking and antibiotic use.

=== Unknown ===
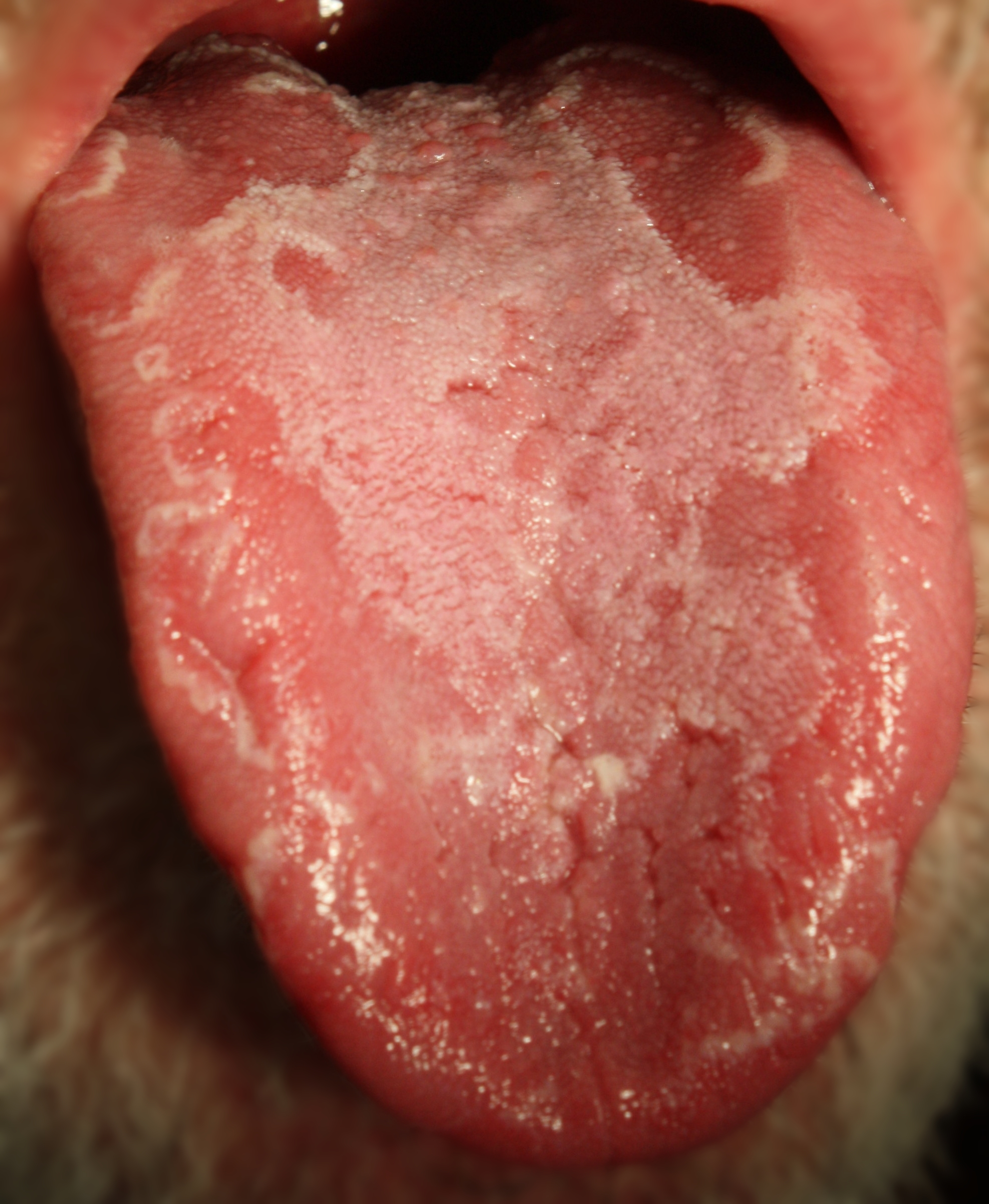
Geographic tongue (benign migratory glossitis)

- Geographic tongue (benign migratory glossitis) - a common disorder which occasionally causes a burning sensation but is usually painless. Irregular patches of depapillation form on the tongue giving the appearance of a map. The cause is unknown.
- Leukoplakia - can affect the tongue
- Tongue coating - food debris, desquamated epithelial cells and bacteria often form a visible tongue coating. This coating has been identified as a major contributing factor in bad breath (halitosis), which can be managed by brushing the tongue gently with a toothbrush or using special oral hygiene instruments such as tongue scrapers or mouth brushes.
- Burning mouth syndrome - this chronic pain disorder commonly involves the tongue. In reflection of this, some of the synonyms for the condition include tongue-specific terms such as "glossodynia" or "burning tongue syndrome". Burning mouth syndrome is characterized by chronic burning sensation on the tongue and other oral mucous membranes in the absences of any identifiable signs or causes.

=== Iatrogenic ===
- Paratrichosis tongue - Real hair implanted on tongue.

== Epidemiology ==
Tongue lesions are very common. For example, in the United States one estimated point prevalence was 15.5% in adults. Tongue lesions are more common in persons who wear dentures and tobacco users. The most common tongue conditions are geographic tongue, followed by fissured tongue and hairy tongue.

== History ==
Hippocrates, Galen and others considered the tongue to be a "barometer" of health, and emphasized the diagnostic and prognostic importance of the tongue. Assessment of the tongue has historically been an important part of a medical examination. The shape and color of the tongue is examined and observed diagnostically in traditional Chinese medicine. For example, scalloping of the tongue is said to indicate qi vacuity. Some modern medical sources still describe the tongue as "the mirror of physical health". This is related to the high rate of turnover of the oral mucosa compared to the skin, which means that systemic conditions may manifest sooner in the mouth than the skin. Physical appearances such as cyanosis are also often more readily apparent in the mouth.

== See also ==
- Tooth pathology
- Tongue
- Tongue map
- Oral and maxillofacial pathology
