= Leukoplakia =

Precancerous white or grey lesion within the mouth

- Other names: Leucoplakia, leukokeratosis, idiopathic leukoplakia, leukoplasia, idiopathic keratosis, idiopathic white/gray patch
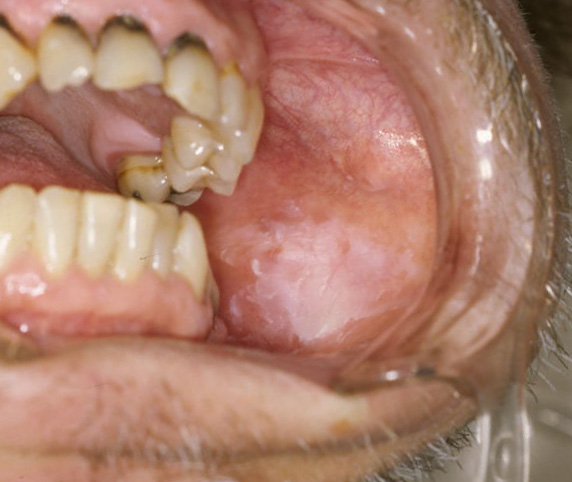
- Leukoplakia on the inside of the cheek
- Specialty: Oral and maxillofacial surgery, Oral medicine, Dentistry
- Symptoms: Firmly attached white/gray patch on a mucous membrane, changes with time, Tongue with a white or light gray color
- Complications: Squamous cell carcinoma
- Usual onset: After 30 years old
- Causes: Unknown
- Risk factors: Smoking, chewing tobacco, excessive alcohol, betel nuts
- Diagnostic method: Made after other possible causes ruled out, tissue biopsy
- Differential diagnosis: Yeast infection, lichen planus, keratosis due to repeated minor trauma
- Treatment: Close follow up, stop smoking, limit alcohol, surgical removal
- Frequency: Up to 8% of men over 70

Oral leukoplakia is a potentially malignant disorder affecting the oral mucosa. It is defined as "essentially an oral mucosal white/gray lesion that cannot be considered as any other definable lesion." Oral leukoplakia is a gray patch or plaque that develops in the oral cavity and is strongly associated with smoking. Leukoplakia is a firmly attached white patch on a mucous membrane which is associated with increased risk of cancer. The edges of the lesion are typically abrupt and the lesion changes with time. Advanced forms may develop red patches. There are generally no other symptoms. It usually occurs within the mouth, although sometimes mucosa in other parts of the gastrointestinal tract, urinary tract, or genitals may be affected.

The cause of leukoplakia is unknown. Risk factors for formation inside the mouth include smoking, chewing tobacco, excessive alcohol, and use of betel nuts. One specific type is common in HIV/AIDS. It is a precancerous lesion, a tissue alteration in which cancer is more likely to develop. The chance of cancer formation depends on the type, with between 3–15% of localized leukoplakia and 70–100% of proliferative leukoplakia developing into squamous cell carcinoma.

Leukoplakia is a descriptive term that should only be applied after other possible causes are ruled out. Tissue biopsy generally shows increased keratin build up with or without abnormal cells, but is not diagnostic. Other conditions that can appear similar include yeast infections, lichen planus, and keratosis due to repeated minor trauma. The lesions from a yeast infection can typically be rubbed off while those of leukoplakia cannot.

Treatment recommendations depend on features of the lesion. If abnormal cells are present or the lesion is small surgical removal is often recommended; otherwise close follow up at three to six month intervals may be sufficient. People are generally advised to stop smoking and limit the drinking of alcohol. In potentially half of cases leukoplakia will shrink with stopping smoking; however, if smoking is continued up to 66% of cases will become more white and thick. The percentage of people affected is estimated at 1–3%. Leukoplakia becomes more common with age, typically not occurring until after 30. Rates may be as high as 8% in men over the age of 70.

== Classification ==
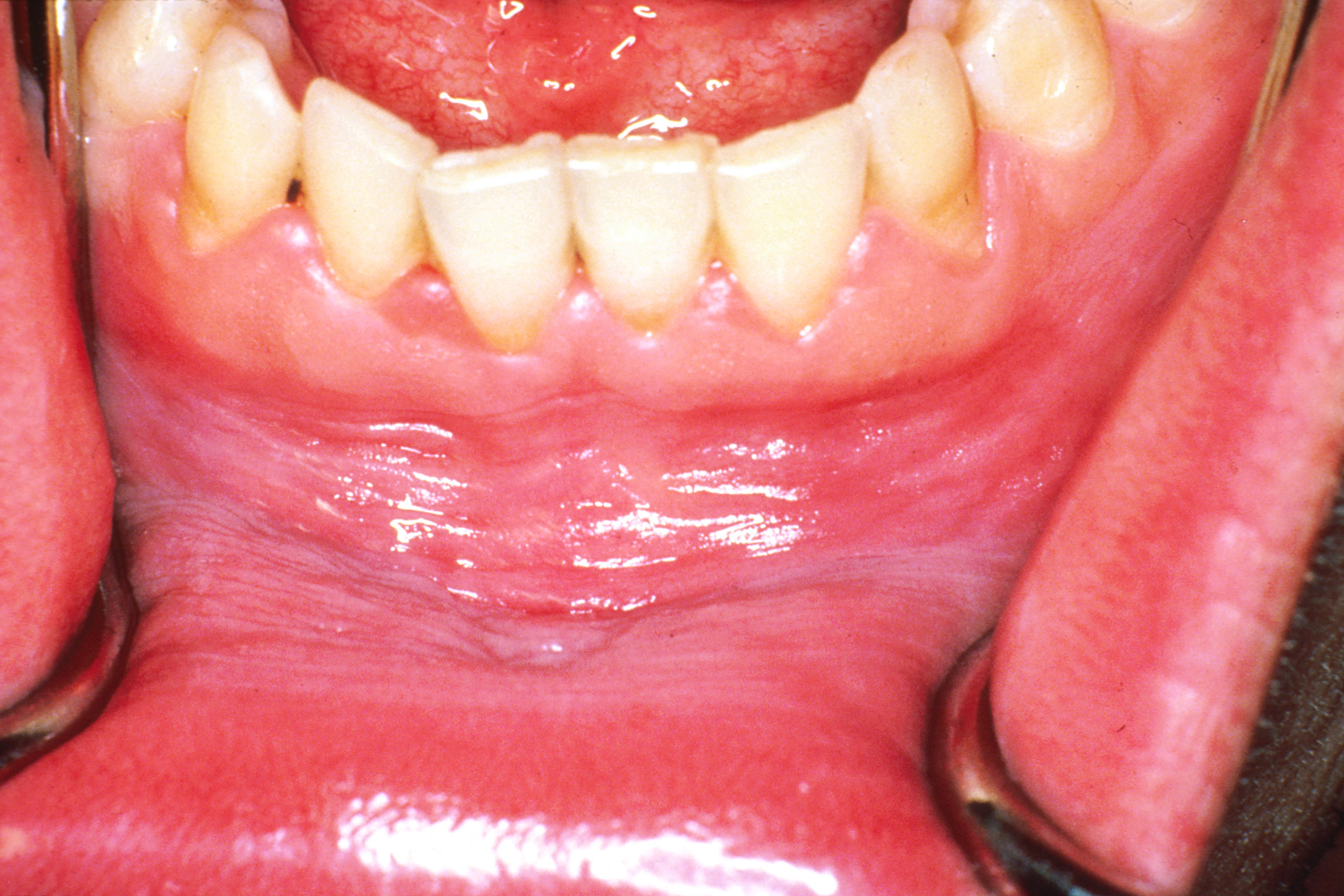
Leukoplakia in the lower labial sulcus

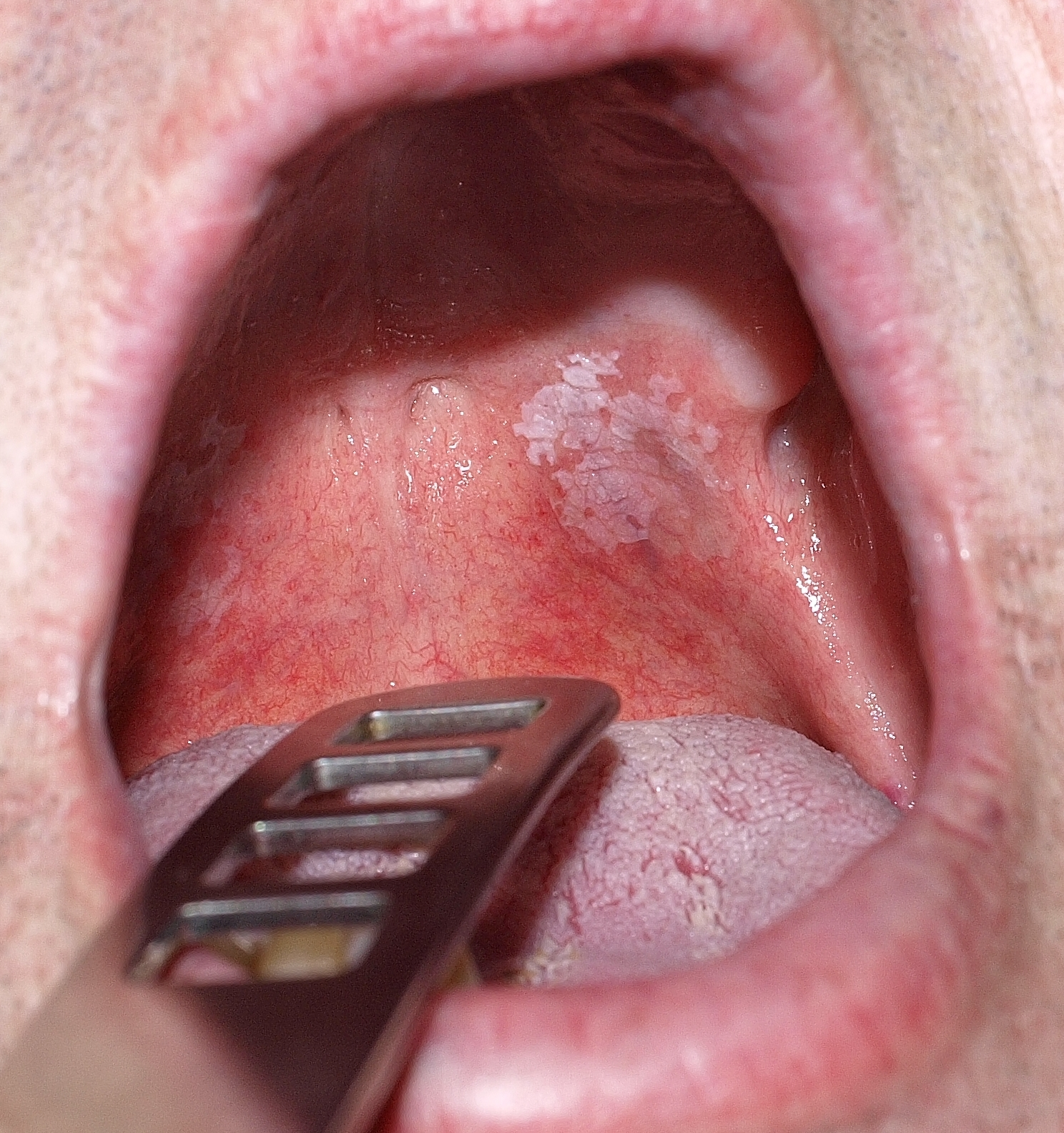
Leukoplakia of the soft palate

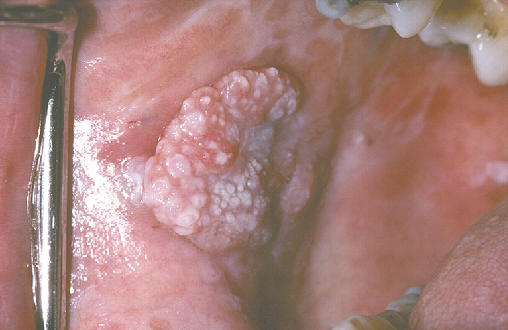
Exophytic leukoplakia on the buccal mucosa

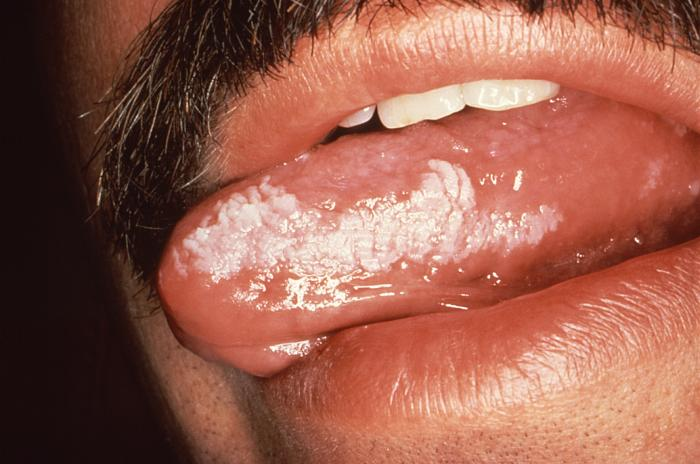
Leukoplakia on the side of tongue

Leukoplakia could be classified as mucosal disease, and also as a premalignant condition. Although the white color in leukoplakia is a result of hyperkeratosis (or acanthosis), similarly appearing white lesions that are caused by reactive keratosis (smoker's keratosis or frictional keratoses e.g. morsicatio buccarum) are not considered to be leukoplakias. Leukoplakia could also be considered according to the affected site, e.g. oral leukoplakia, leukoplakia of the urinary tract, including bladder leukoplakia or leukoplakia of the penis, vulvae, cervix or vagina. Leukoplakia may also occur in the larynx, possibly in association with gastro-esophageal reflux disease. Oropharyngeal leukoplakia is linked to the development of esophageal squamous cell carcinoma, and sometimes this is associated with tylosis, which is thickening of the skin on the palms and soles of the feet (see: Leukoplakia with tylosis and esophageal carcinoma). Dyskeratosis congenita may be associated with leukoplakia of the oral mucosa and of the anal mucosa.

=== Mouth ===
Within the mouth, leukoplakia is sometimes further classified according to the site involved, e.g. leukoplakia buccalis (leukoplakia of the buccal mucosa) or leukoplakia lingualis (leukoplakia of the lingual mucosa). There are two main clinical variants of oral leukoplakia, namely homogeneous leukoplakia and non-homogeneous (heterogenous) leukoplakia, which are described below. The word leukoplakia is also included within the nomenclature of other oral conditions which present as white patches, however, these are specific diagnoses that are generally considered separate from leukoplakia, with the notable exception of proliferative verrucous leukoplakia, which is a recognized sub-type of leukoplakia.

==== Homogeneous leukoplakia ====
Homogeneous leukoplakia (also termed "thick leukoplakia") is usually well defined white patch of uniform, flat appearance and texture, although there may be superficial irregularities. Homogeneous leukoplakia is usually slightly elevated compared to surrounding mucosa, and often has a fissured, wrinkled or corrugated surface texture, with the texture generally consistent throughout the whole lesion. This term has no implications on the size of the lesion, which may be localized or extensive. When homogeneous leukoplakia is palpated, it may feel leathery, dry, or like cracked mud.

==== Non-homogeneous leukoplakia ====
Non-homogeneous leukoplakia is a lesion of non-uniform appearance. The color may be predominantly white or a mixed white and red. The surface texture is irregular compared to homogeneous leukoplakia, and may be flat (papular), nodular or exophytic. "Verrucous leukoplakia" (or "verruciform leukoplakia") is a descriptive term used for thick, white, papillary lesions. Verrucous leukoplakias are usually heavily keratinized and are often seen in elderly people. Some verrucous leukoplakias may have an exophytic growth pattern, and some may slowly invade surrounding mucosa, when the term proliferative verrucous leukoplakia may be used. Non-homogeneous leukoplakias have a greater risk of cancerous changes than homogeneous leukoplakias.

===== Proliferative verrucous leukoplakia =====
Proliferative verrucous leukoplakia (PVL) is a recognized high risk subtype of non-homogeneous leukoplakia. It is uncommon, and usually involves the buccal mucosa and the gingiva (the gums). This condition is characterized by (usually) extensive, papillary or verrucoid keratotic plaques that tends to slowly enlarge into adjacent mucosal sites. An established PVL lesion is usually thick and exophytic (prominent), but initially it may be flat. Smoking does not seem to be as strongly related as it is to leukoplakia generally, and another dissimilarity is the preponderance for women over 50. There is a very high risk of dysplasia, transformation to squamous cell carcinoma with high mortality (PVL does not transform into verrucous carcinoma, which is a lesion with a good prognosis usually; the similarity of names does not reflect the common origin, but only the resemblance of their appearance).

===== Erythroleukoplakia =====
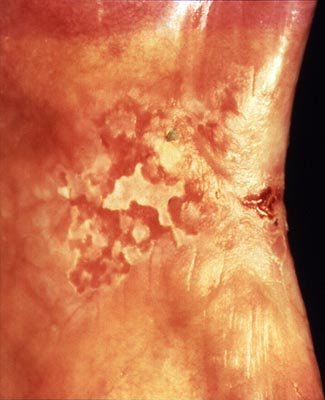
Erythroleukoplakia ("speckled leukoplakia"), left commissure. Biopsy showed mild epithelial dysplasia and candida infection. Antifungal medication may turn this type of lesion into a homogeneous leukoplakia (i.e. the red areas would disappear)

Erythroleukoplakia (also termed speckled leukoplakia, erythroleukoplasia or leukoerythroplasia) is a non-homogeneous lesion of mixed white (keratotic) and red (atrophic) color. Erythroplakia (erythroplasia) is an entirely red patch that cannot be attributed to any other cause. Erythroleukoplakia can therefore be considered a variant of either leukoplakia or erythroplakia since its appearance is midway between. Erythroleukoplakia frequently occurs on the buccal mucosa in the commissural area (just inside the cheek at the corners of the mouth) as a mixed lesion of white nodular patches on an erythematous background, although any part of the mouth may be affected. Erythroleukoplakia and erythroplakia have a higher risk of cancerous changes than homogeneous leukoplakia.

==== Sublingual keratosis ====
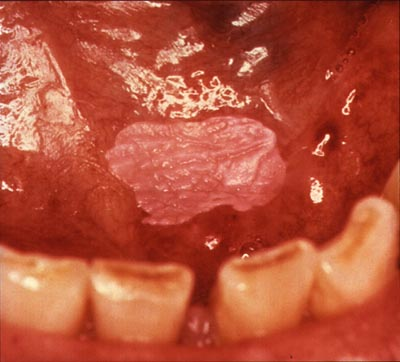
Homogeneous leukoplakia in the floor of the mouth in a smoker. Biopsy showed hyperkeratosis

Sometimes leukoplakia of the floor of mouth or under the tongue is called sublingual keratosis,. though this is not universally accepted to be a distinct clinical entity from idiopathic leukoplakia generally, as it is distinguished from the latter by location only. Usually sublingual keratoses are bilateral and possess a parallel-corrugated, wrinkled surface texture described as "ebbing tide".

==== Candidal leukoplakia ====
Candidal leukoplakia is usually considered to be a largely historical synonym for a type of oral candidiasis, now more commonly termed chronic hyperplastic candidiasis, rather than a subtype of true leukoplakia. However, some sources use this term to refer to leukoplakia lesions that become colonized secondarily by Candida species, thereby distinguishing it from hyperplastic candidiasis.

==== Oral hairy leukoplakia ====
Oral hairy leukoplakia is a corrugated ("hairy") white lesion on the sides of the tongue caused by opportunistic infection with Epstein-Barr virus on a systemic background of immunodeficiency, almost always human immunodeficiency virus (HIV) infection. This condition is not considered to be a true idiopathic leukoplakia since the causative agent has been identified. It is one of the most common oral lesions associated with HIV infection, along with pseudomembraneous candidiasis. The appearance of the lesion often heralds the transition from HIV to acquired immunodeficiency syndrome (AIDS).

==== Syphilitic leukoplakia ====
This term refers to a white lesion associated with syphilis, specifically in the tertiary stage of the infection. It is not considered to be a type of idiopathic leukoplakia, since the causative agent Treponema pallidum is known. It is now rare, but when syphilis was more common, this white patch usually appeared on the top surface of the tongue and carried a high risk of cancerous changes. It is unclear if this lesion was related to the condition itself or whether it was caused by the treatments for syphilis at the time.

=== Esophagus ===
Leukoplakia of the esophagus is rare compared to oral leukoplakia. The relationship with esophageal cancer is unclear because the incidence of esophageal leukoplakia is so low. It usually appears as a small, nearly opaque white lesion that may resemble early esophageal squamous cell carcinoma. The histologic appearance is similar to oral leukoplakia, with hyperkeratosis and possible dysplasia.

=== Bladder ===
In the context of lesions of the mucous membrane lining of the bladder, leukoplakia is a historic term for a visualized white patch which histologically represents keratinization in an area of squamous metaplasia. The symptoms may include frequency, suprapubic pain (pain felt above the pubis), hematuria (blood in the urine), dysuria (difficult urination or pain during urination), urgency, and urge incontinence. The white lesion may be seen during cystoscopy, where it appears as a whitish-gray or yellow lesion, on a background of inflamed urothelium and there may be floating debris in the bladder. Leukoplakia of the bladder may undergo cancerous changes, so biopsy and long term follow up are usually indicated.

=== Anal canal ===
Leukoplakia of the anal canal is rare. It may extend up to the anorectal junction. On digital examination it feels hard and granular, and at proctoscopy, it appears as white plaques which may be diffuse, circumferential, or circumscribed. The histologic appearance is similar to oral leukoplakia, with hyperkeratosis and acanthosis. It may be asymptomatic, with symptoms due to other lesions such as hemorrhoids or fissures. Progression to anal stenosis has been described. The malignant potential is seemingly low, and few cases of anal carcinoma have been reported associated with anal leukoplaka.

== Signs and symptoms ==
Most cases of leukoplakia cause no symptoms, but infrequently there may be discomfort or pain. The exact appearance of the lesion is variable. Leukoplakia may be white, whitish yellow or grey. The size can range from a small area to much larger lesions. The most common sites affected are the buccal mucosa, the labial mucosa and the alveolar mucosa, although any mucosal surface in the mouth may be involved. The clinical appearance, including the surface texture and color, may be homogeneous or non-homogeneous (see: classification). Some signs are generally associated with a higher risk of cancerous changes (see: prognosis).

Leukoplakia may rarely be associated with esophageal carcinoma.

== Causes ==
The exact underlying cause of leukoplakia is largely unknown, but it is likely multifactorial, with the main factor being the use of tobacco. Tobacco use and other suggested causes are discussed below. The mechanism of the white appearance is thickening of the keratin layer, called hyperkeratosis. The abnormal keratin appears white when it becomes hydrated by saliva, and light reflects off the surface evenly. This hides the normal pink-red color of mucosae (the result of underlying vasculature showing through the epithelium). A similar situation can be seen on areas of thick skin such as the soles of the feet or the fingers after prolonged immersion in water. Another possible mechanism is thickening of the stratum spinosum, called acanthosis.

=== Tobacco ===
Tobacco smoking or chewing is the most common causative factor, with more than 80% of persons with leukoplakia having a positive smoking history. Smokers are much more likely to develop leukoplakia than non-smokers. The size and number of leukoplakia lesions in an individual is also correlated with the level of smoking and how long the habit has lasted for. Other sources argue that there is no evidence for a direct causative link between smoking and oral leukoplakia. Cigarette smoking may produce a diffuse leukoplakia of the buccal mucosa, lips, tongue and rarely the floor of mouth. Reverse smoking, where the lit end of the cigarette is held in the mouth is also associated with mucosal changes. Tobacco chewing, e.g. betel leaf and areca nut, called paan, tends to produce a distinctive white patch in a buccal sulcus termed "tobacco pouch keratosis". In the majority of persons, cessation triggers shrinkage or disappearance of the lesion, usually within the first year after stopping.

=== Alcohol ===
Although the synergistic effect of alcohol with smoking in the development of oral cancer is beyond doubt, there is no clear evidence that alcohol is involved in the development of leukoplakia, but it does appear to have some influence. Excessive use of a high alcohol-containing mouth wash (> 25%) may cause a grey plaque to form on the buccal mucosa, but these lesions are not considered true leukoplakia.

=== Sanguinaria ===
Sanguinaria (Bloodroot) is a herbal extract that is included in some toothpastes and mouthwashes. Its use is strongly associated with development of leukoplakia, usually in the buccal sulcus. This type of leukoplakia has been termed "sanguinaria associated keratosis" and more than 80% of people with leukoplakia in the vestibule of the mouth have used this substance. Upon stopping contact with the causative substance, the lesions may persist for many years. Although this type of leukoplakia may show dysplasia, the potential for malignant transformation is unknown.

=== Ultraviolet radiation ===
Ultraviolet radiation is believed to be a factor in the development of some leukoplakia lesions of the lower lip, usually in association with actinic cheilitis.

=== Micro-organisms ===
Candida in its pathogenic hyphal form is occasionally seen in biopsies of idiopathic leukoplakia. It is debated whether candida infection is a primary cause of leukoplakia with or without dysplasia, or a superimposed (secondary) infection that occurs after the development of the lesion. It is known that Candida species thrive in altered tissues. Some leukoplakias with dysplasia reduce or disappear entirely following use of antifungal medication. Smoking, which as discussed above can lead to the development of leukoplakia, can also promote oral candidiasis. Candida in association with leukoplakia should not be confused with white patches which are primarily caused by candida infection, such as chronic hyperplastic candidiasis ("candidal leukoplakia").

The involvement of viruses in the formation of some oral white lesions is well established, e.g. Epstein-Barr virus in oral hairy leukoplakia (which is not a true leukoplakia). Human papilloma virus (HPV), especially HPV 16 and 18, is sometimes found in areas of leukoplakia, however, since this virus can be coincidentally found on normal, healthy mucosal surfaces in the mouth, it is unknown if this virus is involved in the development of some leukoplakias. In vitro experimentation has demonstrated that HPV 16 is capable of inducing dysplastic changes in previously normal squamous epithelium.

=== Epithelial atrophy ===
Leukoplakia is more likely to develop in areas of epithelial atrophy. Conditions associated with mucosal atrophy include iron deficiency, some vitamin deficiencies, oral submucous fibrosis, syphilis and sideropenic dysphagia.

=== Trauma ===
Another very common cause of white patches in the mouth is frictional or irritational trauma leading to keratosis. Examples include nicotine stomatitis, which is keratosis in response to heat from tobacco smoking (rather than a response to the carcinogens in tobacco smoke). The risk of malignant transformation is similar to normal mucosa. Mechanical trauma, e.g. caused by a sharp edge on a denture, or a broken tooth, may cause white patches which appear very similar to leukoplakia. However, these white patches represent a normal hyperkeratotic reaction, similar to a callus on the skin, and will resolve when the cause is removed. Where there is a demonstrable cause such as mechanical or thermal trauma, the term idiopathic leukoplakia should not be used.

== Pathophysiology ==
=== Tumor suppressor genes ===
Tumor suppressor genes are genes involved in the regulation of normal cell turnover and apoptosis (programmed cell death). One of the most studied tumor suppressor genes is p53, which is found on the short arm of chromosome 17. Mutation of p53 can disrupt its regulatory function and lead to uncontrolled cell growth. Mutations of p53 have been demonstrated in the cells from areas of some leukoplakias, especially those with dysplasia and in individuals who smoke and drink heavily.

=== DNA damage ===
DNA damage was measured in oral leukoplakia patients using single cell gel electrophoresis (also called the "comet assay") applied to peripheral blood samples. The level of DNA damage was found to increase in a stepwise manner from healthy controls, through patients with non-dysplastic epithelium to patients with varying grades of dysplasia. In another study, DNA damage, also measured by the comet assay, was found to be greater in oral leukoplakia and squamous-cell carcinoma than in control subjects.

== Diagnosis ==
=== Definition ===
Leukoplakia is a diagnosis of exclusion, meaning that which lesions are included depends upon what diagnoses are currently considered acceptable. Accepted definitions of leukoplakia have changed over time and are still controversial. It is possible that the definition will be further revised as new knowledge becomes available. In 1984 an international symposium agreed upon the following definition: "a whitish patch or plaque, which cannot be characterized clinically or pathologically as any other disease, and is not associated with any physical or chemical agent except the use of tobacco." There were, however, problems and confusion in applying this definition. At a second international symposium held in 1994, it was argued that whilst tobacco was a likely causative factor in the development of leukoplakia, some white patches could be linked directly to the local effects of tobacco by virtue of their disappearance following smoking cessation, suggesting that this kind of white patch represents a reactive lesion to local tissue irritation rather than a lesion caused by carcinogens in cigarette smoke, and could be better termed to reflect this etiology, e.g. smokers' keratosis. The second international symposium, therefore, revised the definition of leukoplakia to: "a predominantly white lesion of the oral mucosa that cannot be characterized as any other definable lesion."

In the mouth, the current definition of oral leukoplakia adopted by the World Health Organization is "white plaques of questionable risk having excluded (other) known diseases or disorders that carry no increased risk for cancer". However, this definition is inconsistently applied in the medical literature, and some refer to any oral white patch as "leukoplakia".

The term has been incorrectly used for white patches of any cause (rather than specifically referring to idiopathic white patches) and also to refer only to white patches which have a risk of cancerous changes. It has been suggested that leukoplakia is an unhelpful term since there is so much inconsistency surrounding its use, and some clinicians now avoid using it at all.

=== Biopsy ===
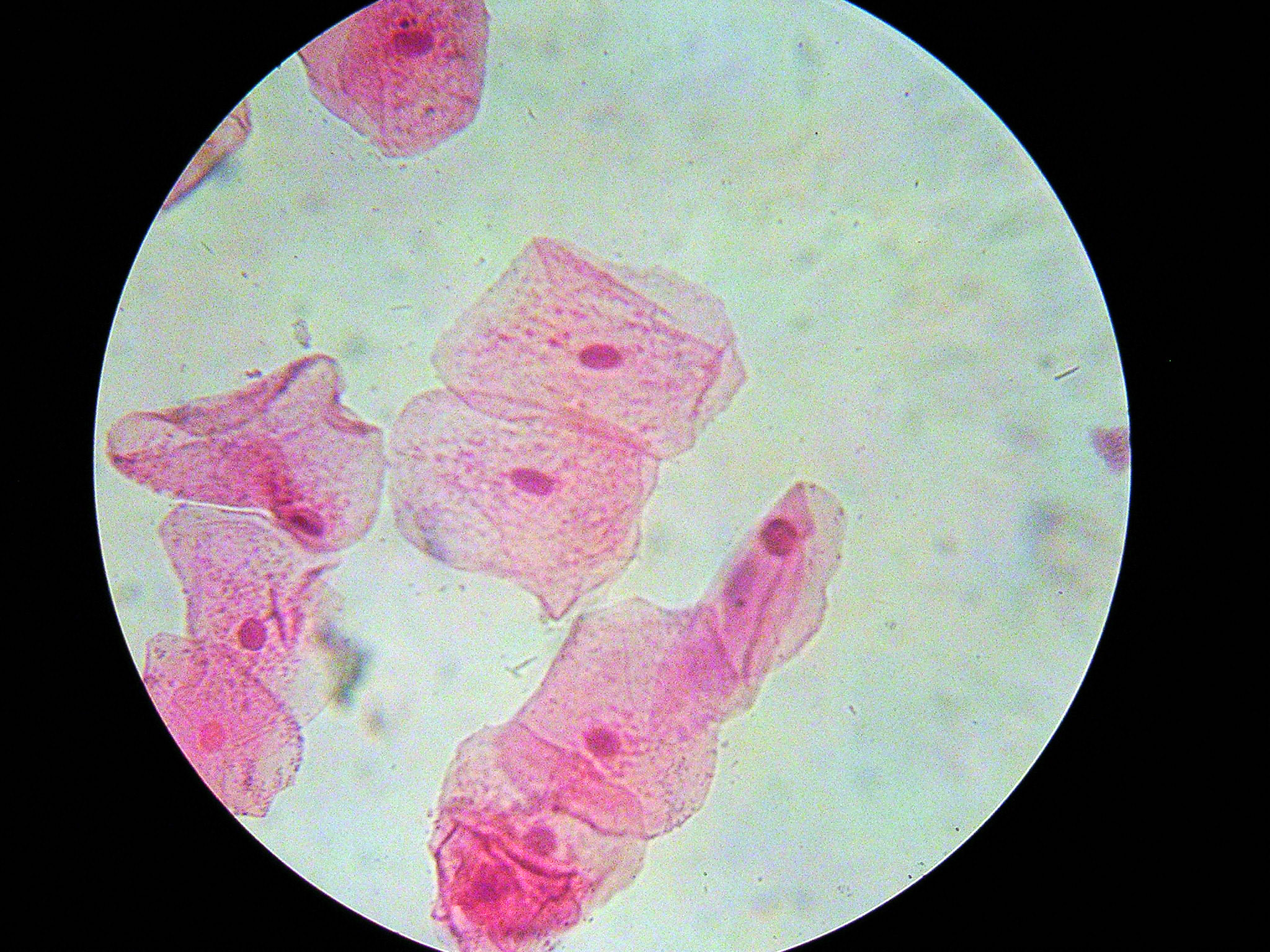
Microscopic examination of keratinocytes scraped from the buccal mucosa

Tissue biopsy is usually indicated to rule out other causes of white patches and also to enable a detailed histologic examination to grade the presence of any epithelial dysplasia. This is an indicator of malignant potential and usually determines the management and recall interval. The sites of a leukoplakia lesion that are preferentially biopsied are the areas that show induration (hardening) and erythroplasia (redness), and erosive or ulcerated areas. These areas are more likely to show any dysplasia than homogeneous white areas.

Brush biopsy/exfoliative cytology is an alternative to incisional biopsy, where a stiff brush is scraped against the lining of the mouth to remove a sample of cells. This is then made into a smear which can be examined microscopically. Sometimes the biopsy site can be selected with adjunct methods which aim to highlight areas of dysplasia. Toluidine blue staining, where the dye is preferentially retained by dysplastic tissue, is sometimes used, but there is high false positive rate. Other methods involve the use of luminescence, relying on either the property of normal autoflorescent molecules in mucosa such as collagen and keratin which is lost from areas of dysplasia or carcinoma under blue light or by initially staining of the mucosa with toluidine blue or dilute acetic acid and examination under white light.

=== Histologic appearance ===
Leukoplakia has a wide range of possible histologic appearances. The degree of hyperkeratosis, epithelial thickness (acanthosis/atrophy), dysplasia and inflammatory cell infiltration in the underlying lamina propria are variable. In mucous membranes, hyperkeratosis can be defined as "an increase in the thickness of the keratin layer of the epithelium, or the presence of such a layer in a site where none would normally be expected." In leukoplakia, the hyperkeratosis varies in thickness and may be either ortho- or para-keratosis, (depending upon whether cell nuclei are lost or retained in the superficial layers respectively), or a mixture of both in different areas of the lesion.

The epithelium may show hypertrophy (e.g. acanthosis) or atrophy. Red areas within leukoplakia represent atrophic or immature epithelium which has lost the ability to keratinize. The transition between the lesion and normal surrounding mucosa may be well-demarcated, or poorly defined. Melanin, a pigment naturally produced in oral mucosa, can leak from cells and give a grey color to some leukoplakia lesions.

Hyperkeratosis and altered epithelial thickness may be the only histologic features of a leukoplakia lesion, but some show dysplasia. The word "dysplasia" generally means "abnormal growth", and specifically, in the context of oral red or white lesions, refers to microscopic changes ("cellular atypia") in the mucosa that indicate a risk of malignant transformation. When dysplasia is present, there is generally an inflammatory cell infiltration in the lamina propria. The following are commonly cited as being possible features of epithelial dysplasia in leukoplakia specimens:

- Cellular pleomorphism, in which cells are of abnormal and different shapes.
- Nuclear atypia, in which the nuclei of cells varies in size, any may be increased in size relative to the cytoplasm, shape, and may stain more intensely. There may also be more prominent nucleoli.
- Increased number of cells seen undergoing mitosis, including both normal and abnormal mitoses. Abnormal mitosis may be abnormally located, e.g. occurring in suprabasal cells (cell layers more superficial to the basal cell layer) or of abnormal form, e.g. "tri-radiate mitoses" (a cell splitting into 3 daughter cells rather than only 2)
- Loss the normal organization of the epithelial layers. The distinction between the epithelial layers may be lost. Normally stratified squamous epithelium shows progressive changes in the form of cells from the basal to the superficial layers, with cells becoming more flat ("squames") towards the surface as a continuous maturation process. In dysplastic epithelium, cells may become vertically orientated rather than becoming flat towards the surface.
- There may be abnormal keratinization, where keratin is formed below the normal keratin layer. This can occur in individual cells or groups of cells, forming an intraepithelial keratin pearl. There may be an increase in the number of basal cells, and they may lose their cellular orientation (losing their polarity and long axis).
- Alteration of the normal epithelial-connective tissue architecture - the rete pegs may become "drop shaped". wider at their base than more superficially.

Generally, dysplasia is subjectively graded by pathologists into mild, moderate or severe dysplasia. This requires experience as it is a difficult skill to learn. It has been shown that there is high degree of inter-observer variation and poor reproducibility in how dysplasia is graded. Severe dysplasia is synonymous with the term carcinoma in situ, denoting the presence of neoplastic cells which have not yet penetrated the basement membrane and invaded other tissues.

=== Differential diagnosis ===
Cause	Diagnosis
Normal anatomic variation	Fordyce's spots (Fordyce's granules)
Developmental	White sponge nevus
Developmental	Leukoedema
Developmental	Pachyonychia congenita
Developmental	Dyskeratosis congenita
Developmental	Tylosis
Developmental	Hereditary benign intraepithelial dyskeratosis
Developmental	Darier's disease (follicular keratosis)
Traumatic	Frictional keratosis (e.g. morsicatio buccarum, linea alba, factitious injury)
Traumatic	Chemical burn
Infective	Oral candidiasis
Infective	Oral hairy leukoplakia
Infective	Syphlytic leukoplakia
Immunologic	Lichen planus
Immunologic	Lichenoid reaction (e.g. Lupus erythematosus, Graft versus host disease, Drug-induced lichenoid reaction)
Immunologic	Psoriasis
Idiopathic and smoking related	Leukoplakia
Idiopathic and smoking related	Smoker's keratosis (Stomatitis nicotina)
Idiopathic and smoking related	Others e.g. Smokeless tobacco keratosis ("tobacco pouch keratosis")
Neoplastic	Oral squamous cell carcinoma
Neoplastic	Carcinoma in situ
Other	Oral keratosis of kidney failure
Other	Skin graft

There are many known conditions that present with a white lesion of the oral mucosa, but the majority of oral white patches have no known cause. These are termed leukoplakia once other likely possibilities have been ruled out. There are also few recognized subtypes of leukoplakia, described according to the clinical appearance of the lesion.

Almost all oral white patches are usually the result of keratosis. For this reason, oral white patches are sometimes generally described as keratoses, although a minority of oral white lesions are not related to hyperkeratosis, e.g. epithelial necrosis and ulceration caused by a chemical burn (see: Oral ulceration#Chemical injury). In keratosis, the thickened keratin layer absorbs water from saliva in the mouth and appears white in comparison with normal mucosa. Normal oral mucosa is a red-pink color due to the underlying vasculature in the lamina propria showing through the thin layer of epithelium. Melanin produced in the oral mucosa also influences the color, with a darker appearance being created by higher levels of melanin in the tissues (associated with racial/physiologic pigmentation, or with disorders causing melanin overproduction such as Addison's disease). Other endogenous pigments can be overproduced to influence the color, e.g. bilirubin in hyperbilirubinemia or hemosiderin in hemochromatosis, or exogenous pigments such as heavy metals can be introduced into the mucosa, e.g. in an amalgam tattoo.

Almost all white patches are benign, i.e. non-malignant. The differential diagnosis of a white lesion in the mouth can be considered according to a surgical sieve (see table).

Leukoplakia cannot be rubbed off the mucosa, distinguishing it readily from white patches such as pseudomembraneous candidiasis, where a white layer can be removed to reveal an erythematous, sometimes bleeding surface underneath. The white color associated with leukoedema disappears when the mucosa is stretched. A frictional keratosis will generally be adjacent to a sharp surface such as a broken tooth or rough area on a denture and will disappear when the causative factor is removed. Some have a suggested as general rule that any lesion that does not show signs of healing within 2 weeks should be biopsied. Morsicatio buccarum and linea alba are located at the level of the occlusal plane (the level at which the teeth meet). A chemical burn has a clear history of placing an aspirin tablet (or other caustic substance such as eugenol) against the mucosa in an attempt to relieve toothache. Developmental white patches usually are present from birth or become apparent earlier in life, whilst leukoplakia generally affects middle aged or elderly people. Other causes of white patches generally require pathologic examination of a biopsy specimen to distinguish with certainty from leukoplakia.

== Management ==
A systematic review found that no treatments commonly used for leukoplakia have been shown to be effective in preventing malignant transformation. Some treatments may lead to healing of leukoplakia, but do not prevent relapse of the lesion or malignant change. Regardless of the treatment used, a diagnosis of leukoplakia almost always leads to a recommendation that possible causative factors such as smoking and alcohol consumption be stopped, and also involves long term review of the lesion, to detect any malignant change early and thereby improve the prognosis significantly.

=== Predisposing factors and review ===
Beyond advising smoking cessation, many clinicians will employ watchful waiting rather than intervene. Recommended recall intervals vary. One suggested program is every 3 months initially, and if there is no change in the lesion, then annual recall thereafter. Some clinicians use clinical photographs of the lesion to help demonstrate any changes between visits. Watchful waiting does not rule out the possibility of repeated biopsies. If the lesion changes in appearance repeat biopsies are especially indicated. Since smoking and alcohol consumption also places individuals at higher risk of tumors occurring in the respiratory tract and pharynx, "red flag" symptoms (e.g. hemoptysis - coughing blood) often trigger medical investigation by other specialties.

=== Surgery ===
Surgical removal of the lesion is the first choice of treatment for many clinicians. However, the efficacy of this treatment modality cannot be assessed due to insufficient available evidence. This can be carried out by traditional surgical excision with a scalpel, with lasers, or with eletrocautery or cryotherapy. Often, if biopsy demonstrates moderate or severe dysplasia then the decision to excise them is taken more readily. Sometimes, white patches are too large to remove completely and instead they are monitored closely. Even if the lesion is completely removed, long term review is still usually indicated since leukoplakia can recur, especially if predisposing factors such as smoking are not stopped.

=== Medications ===
Many different topical and systemic medications have been studied, including anti-inflammatories, antimycotics (target Candida species), carotenoids (precursors to vitamin A, e.g. beta carotene), retinoids (drugs similar to vitamin A), and cytotoxics, but none have evidence that they prevent malignant transformation in an area of leukoplakia. Vitamins C and E have also been studied with regards a therapy for leukoplakia. Some of this research is carried out based upon the hypothesis that antioxidant nutrients, vitamins and cell growth suppressor proteins (e.g. p53) are antagonistic to oncogenesis. High doses of retinoids may cause toxic effects. Other treatments that have been studied include photodynamic therapy.

== Prognosis ==
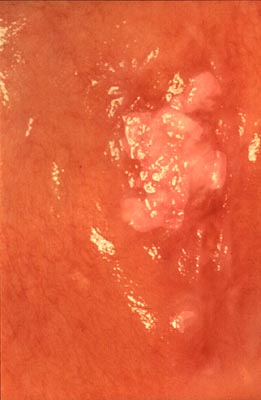
White patch on left buccal mucosa. Biopsy showed early squamous cell carcinoma. The lesion is suspicious because of the presence of nodules

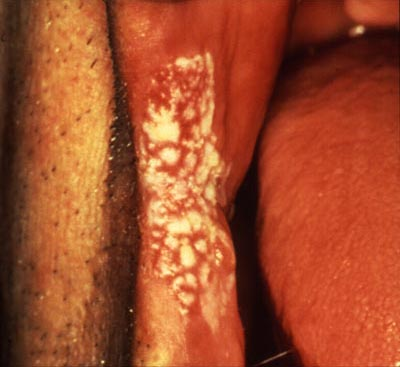
Nodular leukoplakia in right commissure. Biopsy showed severe dysplasia

The annual malignant transformation rate of leukoplakia rarely exceeds 1%, i.e. the vast majority of oral leukoplakia lesions will remain benign. A number of clinical and histopathologic features are associated with varying degrees of increased risk of malignant transformation, although other sources argue that there are no universally accepted and validated factors which can reliably predict malignant change. It is also unpredictable to an extent if an area of leukoplakia will disappear, shrink or remain stable.

- Presence and degree of dysplasia (mild, moderate or severe/carcinoma in situ). While the degree of dysplasia has been shown to be an important predictor of malignant change, many have challenged its use due to the low predictive value from the lack of objectivity of grading dysplasia. While 10% of leukoplakia lesions show dysplasia when biopsied, as many as 18% of oral lesions undergo malignant change in the absence of dysplasia.
- Leukoplakia located on the floor of the mouth, the posterior and lateral tongue, and the retromolar areas (the region behind the wisdom teeth) have higher risk, whereas white patches in areas such as the top surface of the tongue and the hard palate do not have significant risk. Although these "high risk" sites are recognized, statistically, leukoplakia is more common on the buccal mucosa, alveolar mucosa, and the lower labial mucosa. Leukoplakia of the floor of the mouth and tongue accounts for over 90% of leukoplakias showing dysplasia or carcinoma on biopsy. This is thought to be due to pooling of saliva in the lower part of the mouth, exposing these areas to more carcinogens held in suspension.
- Red lesions (erythroplasia) and mixed red and white lesions (erythroleukoplakia/"speckled leukoplakia") have a higher risk of malignant change than homogeneous leukoplakia.
- Verrucous or nodular areas have a higher risk.
- Although smoking increases risk of malignant transformation, smoking also causes many white patches with no dysplasia. This means that statistically, white patches in non-smokers have a higher risk.
- Older people with white patches are at higher risk.
- Larger white patches are more likely to undergo malignant transformation than smaller lesions.
- White patches which have been present for a long period of time have a higher risk.
- Persons with a positive family history of cancer in the mouth.
- Candida infection in the presence of dysplasia has a small increased risk.
- A change in the appearance of the white patch, apart from a change in the color, has a higher risk. Changes in the lesion such as becoming fixed to underlying tissues, ulceration, cervical lymphadenopathy (enlargement of lymph nodes in the neck), and bone destruction may herald the appearance of malignancy.
- White patches present in combination with other conditions that carry a higher risk (e.g. oral submucous fibrosis), are more likely to turn malignant.
- Although overall, oral cancer is more common in males, females with white patches are at higher risk than men.

== Epidemiology ==
The prevalence of oral leukoplakia varies around the world, but generally speaking it is not an uncommon condition. Reported prevalence estimates range from less than 1% to more than 5% in the general population. Leukoplakia is, therefore, the most common premalignant lesion that occurs in the mouth. Leukoplakia is more common in middle-aged and elderly males. The prevalence increases with increasing age. In areas of the world where smokeless tobacco use is common, there is a higher prevalence. In the Middle East region, the prevalence of leukoplakia is less than 1% (0.48%).

== Etymology ==
The word leukoplakia means "white patch", and is derived from the Greek words λευκός - "white" and πλάξ - "plate".

== History ==
The term leukoplakia was coined in 1861 by Karl Freiherr von Rokitansky, who used it to refer to white lesions of the urinary tract. In 1877, Schwimmer first used the term for an oral white lesion. It is now thought that this white lesion on the tongue represented syphilitic glossitis, a condition not included in the modern definitions of oral leukoplakia. Since then, the word leukoplakia has been incorporated into the names for several other oral lesions (e.g. candidal leukoplakia, now more usually termed hyperplastic candidiasis). In 1930, it was shown experimentally that leukoplakia could be induced in rabbits that were subjected to tobacco smoke for 3 minutes per day. According to one source from 1961, leukoplakia can occur on multiple different mucous membranes of the body, including in the urinary tract, rectum, vagina, uterus, vulva, paranasal sinuses, gallbladder, esophagus, eardrums, and pharynx. Generally, oral leukoplakia is the only context where the term is in common usage in modern medicine. In 1988, a case report used the term acquired dyskeratotic leukoplakia to refer to an acquired condition in a female where dyskeratotic cells were present in the epithelia of the mouth and genitalia.
