= GuardLab =

Athletic Company

- Company type: Private
- Industry: Sporting equipment
- Founded: 2014
- Website: GuardLab.com

GuardLab is an American athletic equipment company based in New York City. Founded in 2014, GuardLab focuses on mouthguard design and manufacturing using 3D scanning and 3D printing to provide athletes with proper fit and protection. The company has a partnership with athletic organizations including the AFL and UFC. They have a number of athletes serving on the advisory board and as brand ambassadors, including Mason Plumlee and José Bautista.

== Awards ==
- Gold Winner by the Creativity International Design Awards, 46th Media & Interactive Design competition
