= Linea alba (cheek) =

Streak on the inner cheek level with the plane of biting

- Specialty: Oral medicine, Oral pathology, Dentistry
- Symptoms: Asymptomatic white horizontal line on the inner cheek
- Complications: None
- Causes: Friction, irritation, or pressure from teeth (frictional keratosis)
- Differential diagnosis: Leukoplakia, Lichen planus, Cheek biting

In dentistry, the linea alba (from Latin 'white line') is a horizontal streak on the buccal mucosa (inner surface of the cheek), level with the occlusion (biting plane). It usually extends from the commissure to the posterior teeth, and can extend to the inner lip mucosa and corners of the mouth.

The linea alba is a common finding and most likely associated with pressure, frictional irritation, or sucking trauma from the facial surfaces of the teeth. It may be mistaken for a lesion requiring treatment and may be found in individuals who chew tobacco.

== Clinical considerations ==
- The linea alba is usually present bilaterally.
- It is restricted to dentulous areas (i.e., in areas where there are missing teeth the line will be absent - unless a denture is worn).
- It presents an asymptomatic, linear elevation, with a whitish colour, at the level of the occlusal line of the teeth.

== See also ==
- Crenated tongue
- Morsicatio buccarum
- Linea alba (abdomen)
