= Parafunctional activity =

Use of a body part in an uncommon way

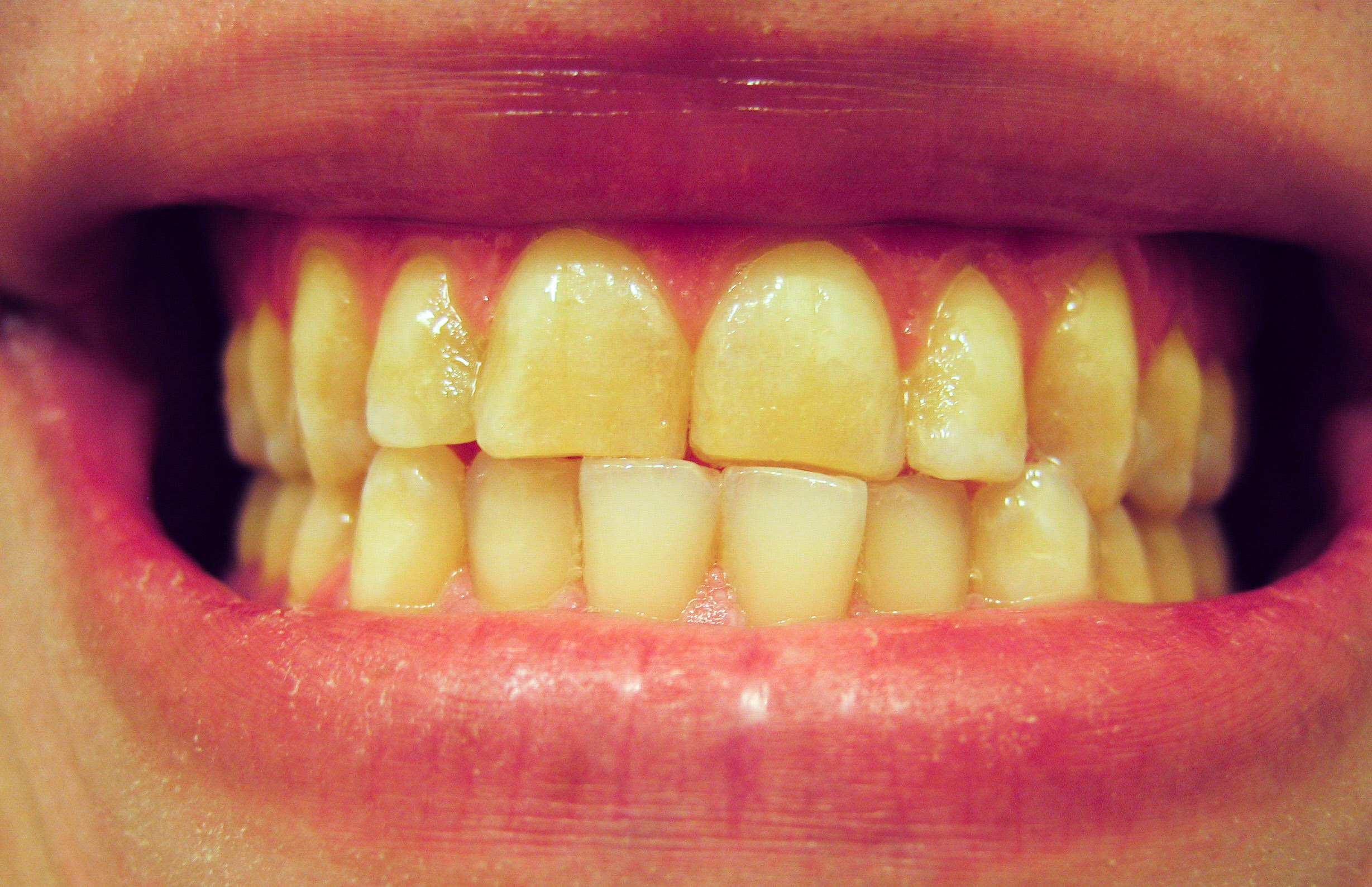
Worn teeth with a deviated midline due to teeth grinding (bruxism)

A para-functional habit or parafunctional habit is the habitual exercise of a body part in a way that is other than the most common use of that body part. In dentistry, orthodontics, and oral and maxillofacial pathology, the body part in question is usually the mouth, tongue, or jaw. Oral para-functional habits may include bruxism (tooth-clenching, grinding, or both), tongue tension ("tongue thrusting"), fingernail biting, pencil or pen chewing, mouth breathing, and any other habitual use of the mouth unrelated to eating, drinking, or speaking.

Crenated tongue is when scalloping develops on the lateral margins of the tongue as a result of habitual forcing of the tongue against the teeth.

Contrary to common belief, functional activities such as chewing are not the main cause of tooth wear. Parafunctional habits are the most destructive forces for several reasons. Whereas teeth rarely come into contact during normal chewing, grinding of teeth may occur 1-4 hours in a 24-hour period, most often during sleep. The amount of pressure placed on teeth during functional habits is 140–550 kilopascals (20–80 psi), but the pressure can range from 2–20.7 megapascals (290–3,000 psi) during parafunctional habits. The direction of forces during functional habits is placed vertically along the long axis of teeth, which is the least harmful because of the anatomical structure of the attachment of teeth to the bone. On the other hand, parafunctional habits direct their forces horizontally. Normally, the temporomandibular joint (TMJ) acts as a class III lever, which helps to restrict the amount of force generated. Class I or class II levers may be created during bruxism, which generates more force from the same amount of muscle activity and subsequently delivers more force to the teeth.

Extreme force upon the teeth can occur during some situations as a protective reflex. When a person senses the risk of an imminent car crash, for example, the teeth arches are normally firmly occluded. This overclenching is still considered parafunctional, although it serves a functional purpose; the maxillomandibular complex is much less vulnerable to harm and dislocation because it is bonded by muscles and interposed teeth. When this kind of reflex acts, having a good memory of one's "best bite" position helps avoid fractures. It is one hypothesis for why military jet pilots crack more teeth than auxiliary crew.
