= Crenated tongue =

Indentations along the sides of the tongue due to compression against the teeth

- Other names: Scalloped tongue, pie crust tongue, lingua indentata, or crenulated tongue
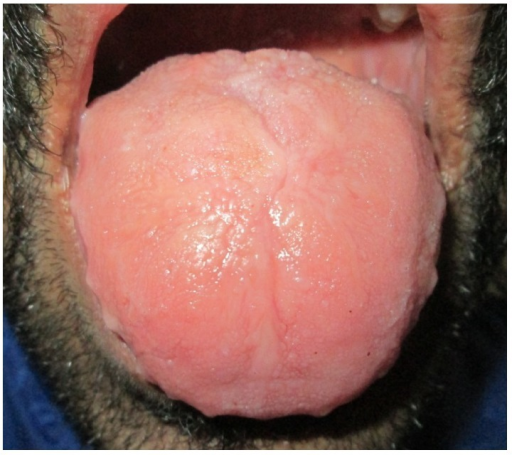
- Macroglossia with crenations along the margins and loss of papillae on dorsum surface of the tongue.
- Specialty: ENT surgery

Crenated tongue is a descriptive term for the appearance of the tongue when there are indentations along the lateral borders (the sides), as the result of compression of the tongue against the adjacent teeth.

The oral mucosa in the area of crenation is usually of normal color, but there may be erythema (redness) if exposed to a high degree of friction or pressure. Crenated tongue is usually asymptomatic and harmless.

It is not a disease as such, but usually results from habits where the tongue is pressed against the lingual surfaces (the side facing the tongue) of the dental arches, or from any cause of macroglossia (enlarged tongue), which in itself has many causes such as Down syndrome.

Where crenation is caused by parafunctional habits, there may also be associated bruxism, linea alba, or morsicatio buccarum.

== Society and culture ==
In traditional Chinese medicine, scalloping of the tongue is said to indicate qi vacuity. In some homeopathic sources, scalloping of the tongue is said to be indicative of high blood pressure. Both claims are unsupported by evidence.

== See also ==
- Tongue disease
