= Mouthguard =

Protective device for the teeth and gums to avoid injury to them

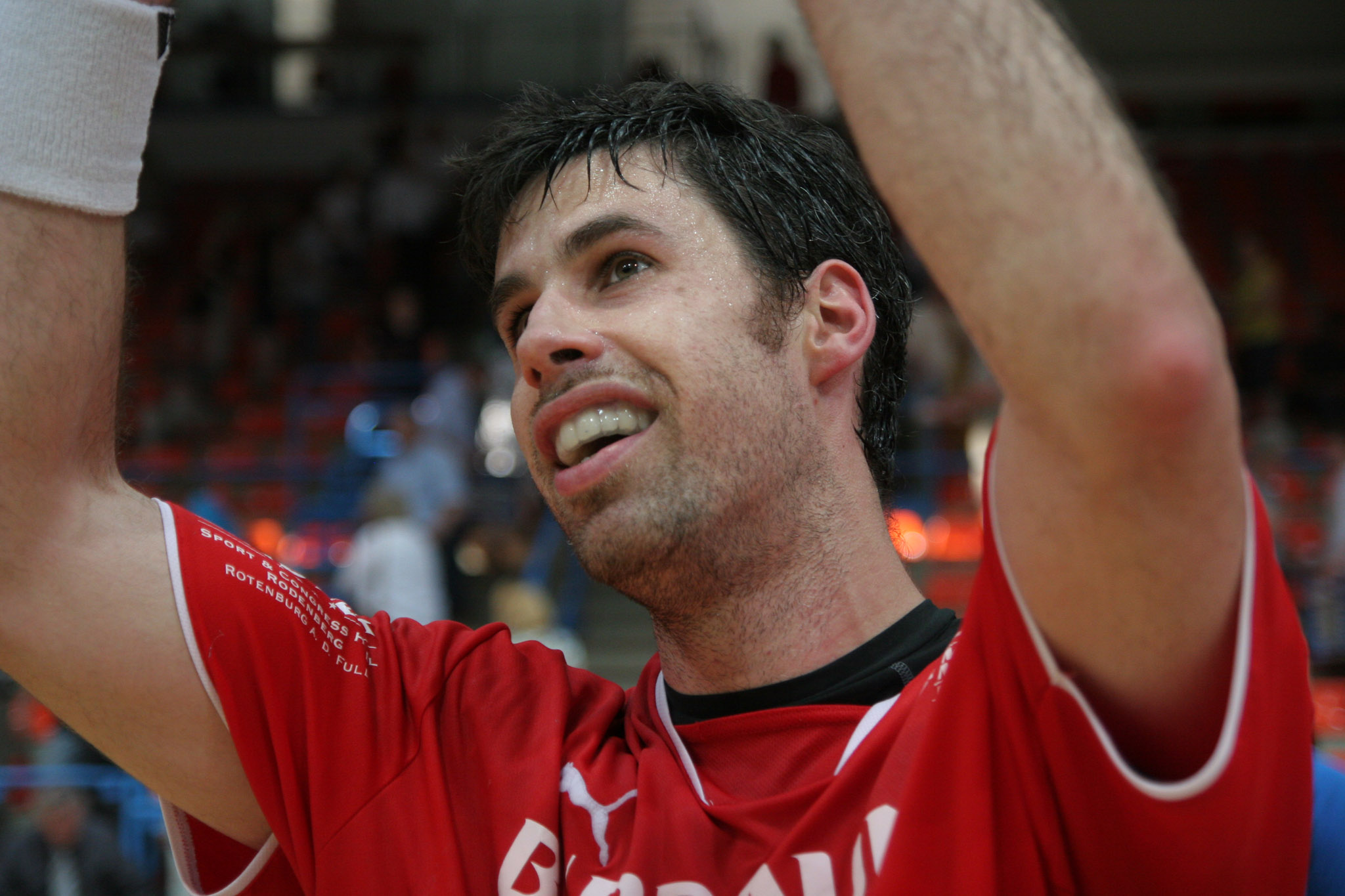
Mouthguard worn in handball, a contact sport.

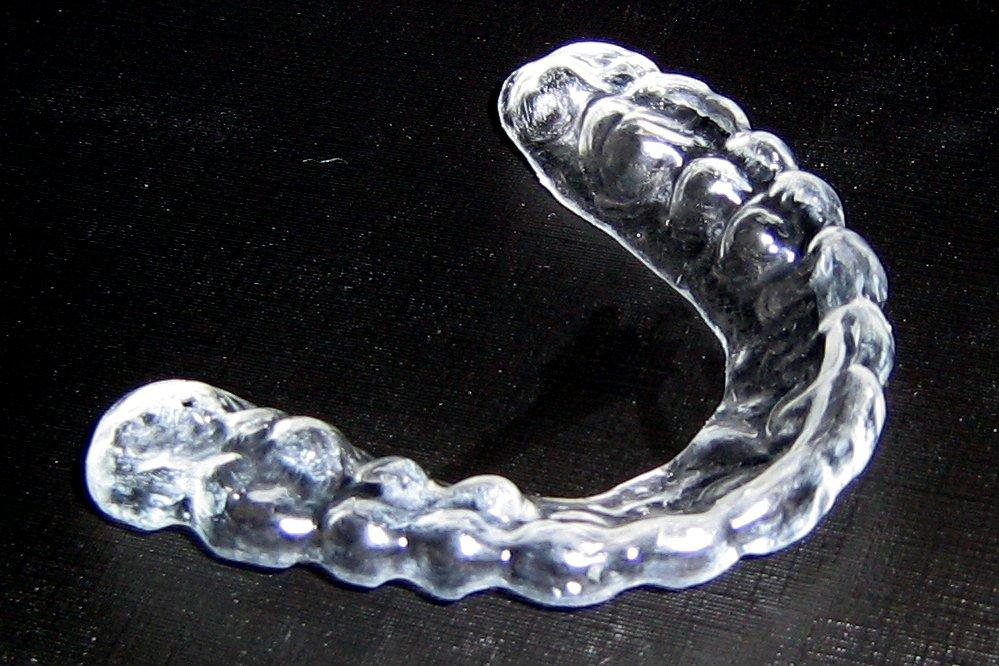
An example of a mouthguard used in the treatment of bruxism.

A mouthguard is a protective device for the mouth that covers the teeth and gums to prevent and reduce injury to the teeth, arches, lips and gums. It also prevents the jaws coming together fully, thereby reducing the risk of jaw joint injuries and concussion. A mouthguard is most often used to prevent injury in contact sports, as a treatment for bruxism or TMD, or as part of certain dental procedures, such as tooth bleaching or sleep apnea treatment. Depending on the application, it may also be called a mouth protector, mouth piece, gumshield, gumguard, nightguard, occlusal splint, bite splint, or bite plane. The dentists who specialise in sports dentistry fabricate mouthguards.

== Types ==
=== Stock or ready made ===
Manufactured in a pre-formed shape in various sizes but with nearly no adjustment to fit the user's mouth. The only adjustment possible is minor trimming with a knife or scissors.

=== Mouth adapted or "boil and bite" ===
A thermoplastic material manufactured in a pre-formed shape in various sizes that can be adapted to fit more closely to an individual's teeth and gums by heating and molding such as boiling then placing in the mouth. Some are now available that incorporate special fins within the fitting zones which increase retention and give an improved fit over traditional boil-and-bite mouth types. Guards are usually made of Ethylene-vinyl acetate, commonly known as EVA. Some of the newer technologies offer an alternative, stronger thermo-polymer that allows for lower molding temperatures, below 140F to prevent burning by scalding hot water. This is the most popular mouthguard used by amateur and semi-professional sportsmen, providing adequate protection but relatively low comfort in comparison to the custom-made guard.

=== Custom-made ===
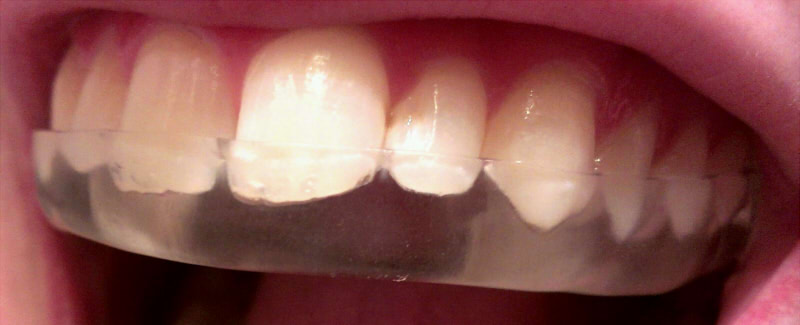
Vacuum form mouthguard made from an impression using dental alginate.

An impression of the user's teeth is used to create a best-fit mouth protector. The impression may be obtained by using a specially designed impression kit that uses dental putty, or from a dentist who will take an impression in dental alginate material. In the EU, the guard must be sold with a CE mark and the guard must have passed an EC Type-Examination test, performed by an accredited European Notified Body.

- Vacuum form
  - Custom-made mouth guards using this type of machine produce single layer mouth guards
  - Fit not as good as pressure laminated but offers more protection than boil and bite
- Pressure laminated
  - Custom-made mouth guards using this type of machine produce multi-layer mouth guards
  - Offers superior fit, comfort and more protection
- Impressionless
  - Made from a medical-grade thermo polymer, the guards are activated with hot (not boiling) water and create a custom comfort fit, completely unique to the shape of the mouth.
  - 1.6 mm thin, Remoldable, Works with braces, Stays secure in mouth during the entire game or practice
  - Allows athletes to talk, breathe and drink naturally

=== Dentistry ===
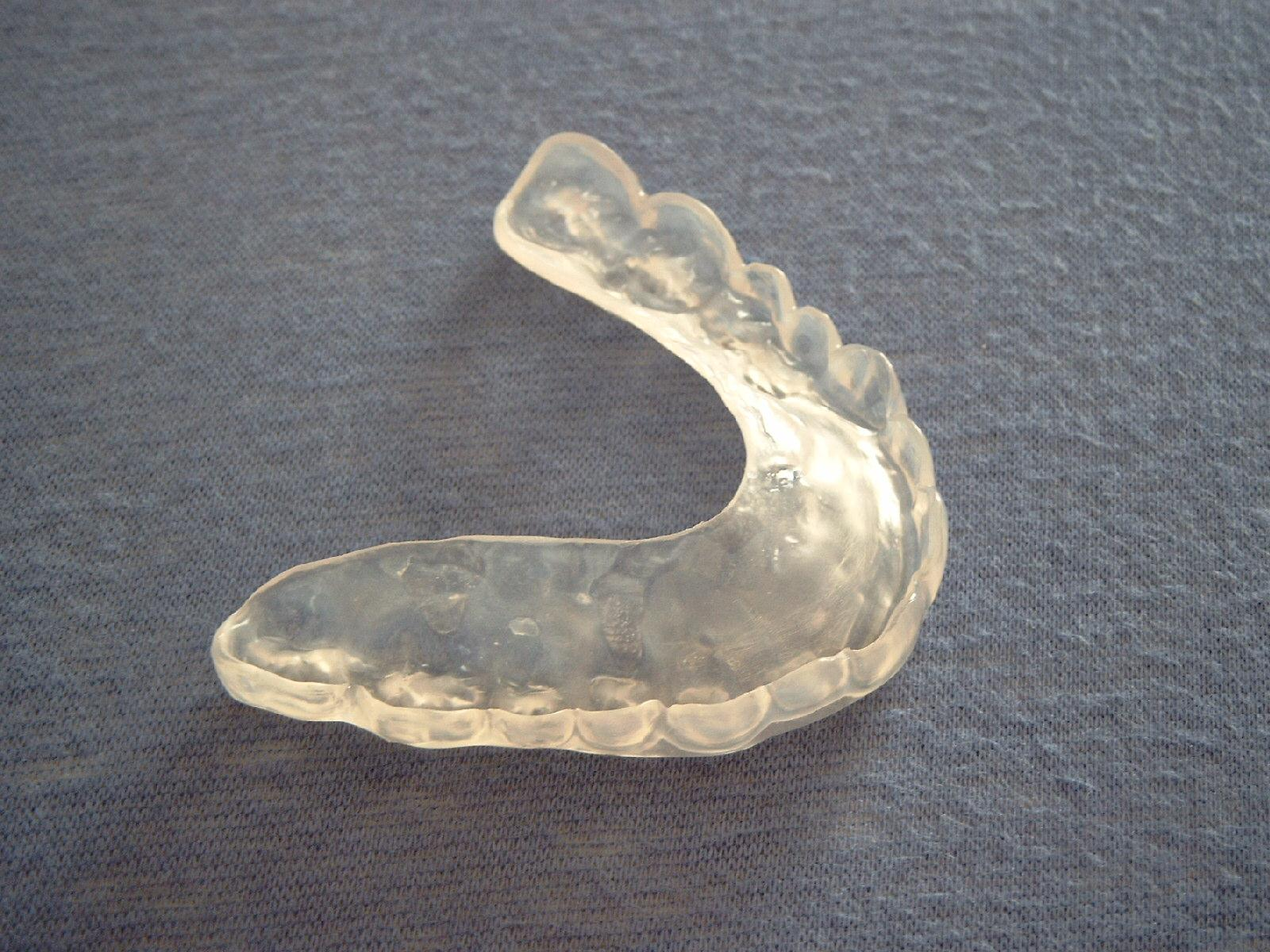
Occlusal splint

Occlusal splints (also called bite splints, bite planes, or night guards) are removable dental appliances carefully molded to fit the upper or lower arches of teeth.

They are used to protect tooth and restoration surfaces, manage mandibular (jaw) dysfunction TMD, and stabilize the jaw joints during occlusion or create space prior to restoration procedures. People prone to nocturnal bruxism, or nighttime clenching, as well as morsicatio buccarum may routinely wear occlusal splints at night. However, a meta-analysis of occlusal splints used for this purpose concluded "There is not enough evidence to state that the occlusal splint is effective for treating sleep bruxism. An indication of its use is questionable concerning sleep outcomes, but there may be some benefit with regard to tooth wear."

Occlusal splints are typically made of a heat-cured acrylic resin. Soft acrylic or light cured composite, or vinyl splints may be made more quickly and cheaply, but are not as durable, and are more commonly made for short-term use. Soft splints are also used for children because normal growth changes the fit of hard splints.

They cover all the teeth of the upper or lower arch, but partial coverage is sometimes used. Occlusal splints are usually used on either the upper or the lower teeth, termed maxillary splints or mandibular splints respectively, but sometimes both types are used at the same time. Maxillary splints are more common, although various situations favor mandibular splints.

Stabilizing or Michigan-type occlusal splints are generally flat against the opposing teeth, and help jaw muscle relaxation, while repositioning occlusal splints are used to reposition the jaw to improve occlusion.

A neuromuscular splint, also known as a neuromuscular orthotic, is a repositioning splint made on the bottom teeth by using ultralow frequency transcutaneous electrical nerve stimulation (ULF-TENs). It can be used as a temporary, reversible, diagnostic device prior to major reconstructive dentistry to improve occlusion. It has also been shown to help headaches, improve athletic performance and some medical conditions. Advanced use of this technique has been studied and used worldwide to help people with tooth loss, replacement and stabilization of temporomandibular joint problems.

== Usage ==
- Dental trauma
  - Mouthguards are used in sports where deliberate or accidental impacts to the face and jaw may cause harm. Such impacts may occur in many sports including baseball, boxing, mixed martial arts, puroresu, rugby, wrestling, football (soccer), gridiron football, Gaelic football, Australian football, lacrosse, basketball, figure skating, ice hockey, underwater hockey, field hockey, water polo, skiing, and snowboarding. Mouthguards may also prevent or reduce harm levels of concussion in the event of an injury to the jaw. In many sports, the rules of the sport make their use compulsory, or local health laws demand them. Schools also often have rules requiring their use. Studies in various high risk populations for dental injuries have repeatedly found low compliance with the prescribed regular use of mouthguard during activities. Moreover, even with regular use, effectiveness in prevention on dental trauma is not complete, and injuries can still occur even when mouthguards are used as users are not always aware of the best makes or size, resulting in a poor fit.
- Oral medicine
  - Mouthguards may be used as splints to reduce strain over the temporomandibular joint in temporomandibular joint disorder
  - To prevent tooth attrition in bruxism
  - To deliver topical medication (e.g., corticosteroids) for chronic gingival diseases such as mucous membrane pemphigoid.
  - As a therapeutic device in the treatment of morsicatio buccarum.
- Dental aesthetics
  - During tooth bleaching
  - As a night protector of thin porcelain bridges
- Orthodontics
  - Transparent or clear aligner, which is basically an acrylic thermoplastic splints, used to correct a series of different malocclusions. Not all malocclusions can be corrected with transparent aligners, only mild and moderate malocclusions. They can be used alone or in combination with brackets. There are many brands.
  - Two types of mouthguards, the mandibular advancement device (MAD) and the tongue stabilizing device (TSD), are used for treating sleep apnea and snoring

== History ==
The exact origins of the mouthguard are unclear. Most evidence indicates that the concept of a mouthguard was initiated in the sport of boxing. Originally, boxers fashioned rudimentary mouthguards out of cotton, tape, sponge, or small pieces of wood. Boxers clenched the material between their teeth. These boxers had a hard time focusing on the fight and clenching their teeth at the same time. Since these devices proved impractical, Woolf Krause, a British dentist, began to fashion mouthpieces for boxers in 1892. Krause placed strips of a natural rubber resin, gutta-percha, over the maxillary incisors of boxers before they entered the ring. Phillip Krause, Woolf Krause’s son, is often credited with the first reusable mouthpiece. Phillip Krause’s invention was highlighted in a 1921 championship fight between Jack Britton and Ted "Kid" Lewis. Lewis was a school friend of Krause and the first professional to utilize the new technology, then called a ‘gum shield.’ During the fight, Britton’s manager successfully argued that the mouthpiece was an illegal advantage. Philip Krause was an amateur boxer himself and undoubtedly used his device before 1921.

There have been other claims to the invention of the mouthguard as well. In the early 1900s, Jacob Marks created a custom-fitted mouthguard in London. An American dentist, Thomas A. Carlos, also developed a mouth guard at approximately the same time as Krause. Carlos claimed that he made his first mouthpiece in 1916 and later suggested his invention to the United States Olympian Dinnie O’Keefe in 1919. Another dentist from Chicago, E. Allen Franke, also claimed to have made many mouth guards for boxers by 1919. The mouthguard’s relevance was again brought to the center of attention in a 1927 boxing match between Jack Sharkey and Mike McTigue. McTigue was winning for most of the fight, but a chipped tooth cut his lip, and he was forced to forfeit the match. From that point on, mouthguards were ruled acceptable and soon became commonplace for all boxers. In 1930, descriptions of mouthguards first appeared in dental literature. Dr. Clearance Mayer, a dentist and boxing inspector for the New York State Athletic Commission, described how custom mouthguards could be manufactured from impressions using wax and rubber. Steel springs were even recommended to reinforce soft materials.

In 1947, a Los Angeles dentist, Rodney O. Lilyquist, made a breakthrough by using transparent acrylic resin to form what he termed an "acrylic splint". Molded to fit unobtrusively over the upper or lower teeth, the acrylic mouthguard was a distinct improvement over the thick mouthguard worn by boxers. It meant that the athlete could talk in a normal manner while the mouthguard was in place. In the January 1948 issue of the Journal of the American Dental Association, the procedure for making and fitting the acrylic mouthguard was described in detail by Dr. Lilyquist. He immediately received nationwide recognition as the father of the modern mouthguard for athletes. The first athlete to wear the acrylic mouthguard was a member of the UCLA basketball team, Dick Perry, who modeled the device at a convention of the Southern California Dental Association. Another early wearer was Frankie Albert, quarterback for the San Francisco 49ers.

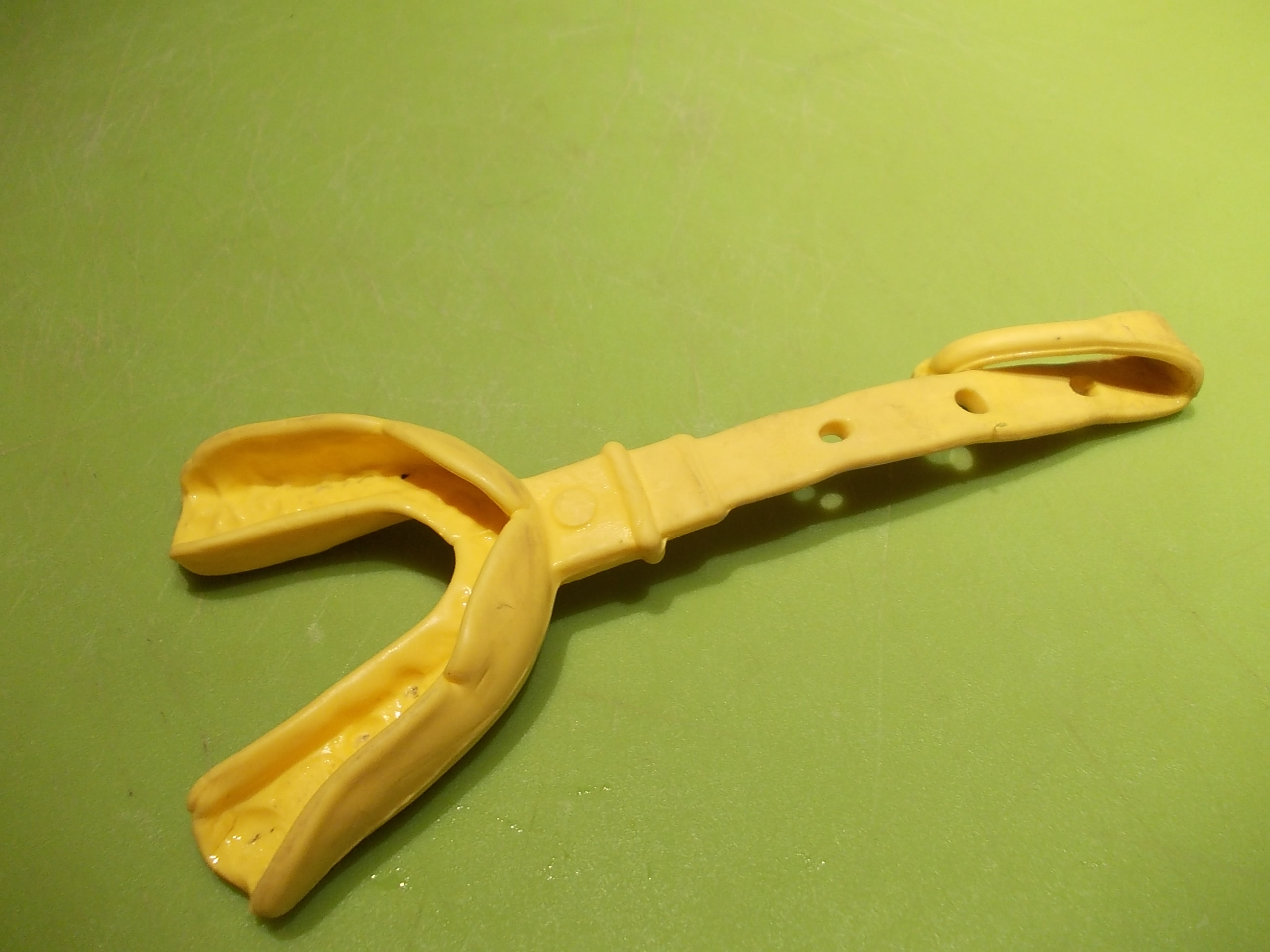
American Football mouthguard

In the 1940s and 1950s, dental injuries were responsible for 24-50% of all injuries in American football. In 1952, Life magazine did a report on Notre Dame football players without incisors. The article drew a lot of public attention and led to the inclusion of mouthguards in other contact sports. In the 1950s, the American Dental Association (ADA) began researching mouthguards and soon promoted their benefits to the public. In 1960, the ADA recommended the use of latex mouthguards in all contact sports. By 1962, all high school football players in the United States were required to wear mouthguards. The National Collegiate Athletic Association (NCAA) followed suit in 1973 and made mouthguards mandatory in college football. Since the introduction of the mouthguard, the number of dental injuries has decreased dramatically.

Mouthguards have become a standard in many sports. In addition to football, the NCAA currently requires mouthguards in ice hockey, field hockey, and lacrosse. The ADA shows that mouthguards are extremely effective in preventing facial injury in contact and non-contact sports. The ADA recommends mouthguards be used in 29 sports: acrobatics, basketball, bicycling, boxing, equestrian, football, gymnastics, handball, ice hockey, inline skating, lacrosse, martial arts, racquetball, rugby football, shot putting, skateboarding, skiing, skydiving, soccer, softball, squash, surfing, volleyball, water polo, weightlifting and wrestling. Mouthguard use during Gaelic football games and training is mandatory at all levels.

== See also ==
- Bruxism
- Dental trauma
