= Leiomyomatous hamartoma =

Hamartoma appearing as painless, soft polypoid mass

Leiomyomatous hamartoma is a hamartoma which appears as a painless, soft polypoid (polyp-like) mass. It usually is found on the tongue, around the nasopalatine foramen, or in the nasopharynx. The lesion is composed of a proliferation of fusiform and spindle smooth muscle cells.
