= Leukoedema =

- Other names: Leucoedema
- Specialty: Oral medicine

Leukoedema is a diffuse, bilateral gray-white or milky opacification of the mucosa, particularly the buccal mucosa (inside of cheeks). It may extend to the labial mucosa and lips along the occlusal line in the canine-molar region. It may also occur on the mucosa of the larynx or vagina. It is a harmless and very common condition. Because it is so common, it has been argued that it may in fact represent a variation of the normal appearance rather than a disease, but empirical evidence suggests that leukoedema is an acquired condition caused by local irritation. It is found more commonly in black skinned people and tobacco users. The term is derived from the Greek words λευκός leukós, "white" and οἴδημα oídēma, "swelling".

== Epidemiology ==
Leukoedema is a common condition and multiple studies have demonstrated significant ethnic variation in its prevalence. It occurs in about 58-94% of dark skinned adults, especially those aged 41–45 years and about 50% of dark skinned children. The prevalence in white skinned people is considerably less, but reports range from 43% to 45%, probably varying depending upon the population studied, and the methods used in the study, e.g. examination conditions and the diagnostic criteria. The ethnic variation may be explained by genetic factors or simply because dark skinned people have more melanin in the mucosa, making it appear darker (termed racial or physiologic pigmentation). This darker mucosa may make the edematous changes more noticeable, whereas in the mucosa of people with lighter skin types leukoedema gives a milder presentation. Empirical evidence supports that leukoedema is influenced by chronic local irritation, as high prevalences have been documented among individuals who chew coca leaf–lime and among tobacco users in multiple studies.

== History ==
Leukoedema was once thought to occur only in adults, until Martin and Crump later reported cases in children and adolescents. The lesion was first formally described by Sandstead and Lowe in 1953, who believed it might be related to leukoplakia. In the following years, several researchers investigated its cause and nature, and their clinical and histologic studies confirmed that leukoedema is benign, leading to the dismissal of earlier concerns about malignancy.

== Causes ==
The cause of leukoedema is generally described as unknown, thought to be a variation of normal anatomy rather than a disease. Nonetheless, it is frequently suggested that the condition manifests in irritated areas. Smoking and diabetes mellitus are two specific systemic conditions and behaviours linked to leukoedema; some studies have found that smokers have a higher incidence and severity of the lesion. Additionally, clinical experience suggests that chewers of betel quid are more likely to experience leukoedema

== Clinical Manifestation ==
Leukoedema is a common, acquired disorder of the oral mucosa that is entirely asymptomatic and has no potential for malignant transformation. Clinically, the lesion presents as a diffuse, bilateral, and symmetrical whitish, whitish-gray, or grayish-opalescent area with a smooth surface and a characteristic veil-like, milky, or filmy quality. Its appearance can vary with progression: in early stages, it manifests as a filmy opalescence, while in later stages, it develops a more definite grayish-white color and a coarsely wrinkled or folded surface, sometimes exhibiting mucosal folds, wrinkles, or whitish streaks. A key diagnostic sign is its transient nature, as the white or opalescent appearance can be incidentally diminished or disappears temporarily upon gentle stretching of the mucosa, reappearing when the stretching is stopped. The lesions are consistently non-scrapable. Regarding distribution, it is most commonly found on the buccal mucosa—often involving most of its surface and is most noticeable along the occlusal line in the bicuspid and molar region—and also commonly appears on the lateral borders of the tongue bilaterally. It is less commonly found on the labial mucosa (oral surface of the lips) and rarely affects the floor of the mouth, palatopharyngeal, and laryngeal tissues. The disorder may be present at any age and commonly has periods of exacerbation and remission. In some cases, desquamation (shedding of the outer layer) occurs, which can leave the surface eroded.

== Investigation ==
(A) Clinical examination:

- Leukoedema disappears temporarily after gentle stretching of the mucosa, which reappears after quitting the manipulation.

(B) Tissue Biopsy

- A tissue biopsy is generally not indicated for leukoedema; however, if one is performed, the histological features typically show the following:
- The common histology finding in leukoedema includes epithelial layer thickening, intracellular edema of intermediate cell layer/malpighian layer. Some authors also suggest that histology of leukoedema is also presented with broadening rete pegs which are irregular surfaces without keratinization as well as retention of superficial cells such as parakeratotic or ballooning cells with incomplete shedding.

== Pathogenesis ==
Generally leukoedema is a combination of vacuolated mid-epithelial cells, collapsed layers and ballooning superficial cells that reflects a condition of mild, reversible epithelial degeneration and keratin maturation. It is not premalignancy.

1. The milky white appearance seen clinically is resulted from the vacuolization of the epithelial cells with granular material. It is neither inflamed nor containing any glycogen.
2. Abnormal mitochondria is shown in the vacuolated cell suggesting mild cellular stress.
3. The vacuolated cells then collapsed into a compact, flattened layer when moved towards the epithelial surface.
4. Above the flattened layer, cells swell again to form ballooning cells that are non-vacuolated, showing keratohyalin granules and containing organelles remnants. Where the superficial changes may suggest incomplete keratinization.
5. Mild, reversible cellular degeneration seen which is caused by impaired mitochondrial function.

== Diagnosis and differential diagnosis ==
Leukoedema is diagnosed clinically by its characteristic diffuse, grayish-white, opalescent appearance of the buccal mucosa that becomes less prominent or disappears upon stretching, a feature considered the most reliable method of identification. The main differential diagnoses include:

Main differential diagnosis	Explanation
leukoplakia	presents as a persistent white patch that does not diminish with stretching and may have premalignant potential
oral candidiasis	white plaques can be wiped off, revealing an erythematous surface
oral lichen planus	recognised by reticular white striae or erosive areas that remain unchanged on stretching
white sponge nevus	a congenital keratinisation disorder presenting with thickened, corrugated, symmetrical white plaques that begin in childhood and do not fade with stretching
morsicatio buccarum or frictional keratosis	shows shredded or rough keratotic surfaces due to chronic cheek biting

Accurate diagnosis relies on clinical examination, assessment of onset, surface texture, scrapability, risk-factor history (e.g., tobacco, irritants), and the stretching test, which uniquely distinguishes leukoedema from these other conditions.

== Treatment and prognosis ==
Leukoedema is a harmless condition with no malignant potential, and no treatment is indicated. Due to the similarity in appearance to other white lesions of the oral cavity, a biopsy may be performed if there are doubts in the diagnosis. For smokers with pronounced leukoedema, effective smoking cessation may make the condition less significant. Topical tretinoin for 30 days may also be advised.
