= Morsicatio buccarum =

Injury to the inner cheek lining due to repeated biting

- Other names: Chronic cheek biting and Chronic cheek chewing
- Specialty: Oral medicine

Morsicatio buccarum is a condition characterized by chronic irritation or injury to the buccal mucosa (the lining of the inside of the cheek within the mouth), caused by repetitive chewing, biting, or nibbling.

== Signs and symptoms ==
The lesions are located on the mucosa, usually bilaterally in the central part of the anterior buccal mucosa and along the occlusal plane level (the level at which the upper and lower teeth meet). Sometimes, the tongue or the labial mucosa (the inside lining of the lips) is affected by a similarly produced lesion, termed morsicatio linguarum and morsicatio labiorum, respectively. There may be a coexistent linea alba, which corresponds to the occlusal plane, or crenated tongue. The lesions are white with thickening and shredding of mucosa commonly combined with intervening zones of erythema (redness) or ulceration. The surface is irregular, and people may occasionally have loose sections of mucosa that come away.

== Causes ==
The cause is the chronic parafunctional activity of the masticatory system, which produces frictional, crushing, and incisive damage to the mucosal surface, and over time, the characteristic lesions develop. Most people know a cheek-chewing habit, although it may be performed subconsciously. Sometimes poorly constructed prosthetic teeth may be the cause if the original bite is altered. Usually, the teeth are placed too far facially (i.e., buccally and/or labially), outside the "neutral zone", which is the term for the area where the dental arch is usually situated, where lateral forces between the tongue and cheek musculature are in balance. Glassblowing involves chronic suction and may produce similar irritation of the buccal mucosa. Identical or more severe damage may be caused by self-mutilation in people with psychiatric disorders, learning disabilities, or rare syndromes (e.g. Lesch–Nyhan syndrome and familial dysautonomia).

== Diagnosis ==
The diagnosis is usually made on the clinical appearance alone, and biopsy is not usually indicated. The histologic appearance is one of marked hyperparakeratosis producing a ragged surface with many projections of keratin. Typically there is superficial colonization by bacteria. There may be vacuolated cells in the upper portion of the prickle cell layer. There is a similarity between this appearance and that of hairy leukoplakia, linea alba and leukoedema. In people with human immunodeficiency virus, who are at higher risk of oral hairy leukoplakia, a tissue biopsy may be required to differentiate between this and frictional keratosis from cheek and tongue chewing.

=== Classification ===
Morsicatio buccarum is a type of frictional keratosis. The term is derived from the Latin words, morusus meaning "bite" and bucca meaning "cheek". This term has been described as "a classic example of medical terminology gone astray".

The Diagnostic and Statistical Manual of Mental Disorders, Fifth Edition (DSM-5) classifies the condition under "Other Specified Obsessive-Compulsive and Related Disorder" (300.3) as a body-focused repetitive behavior; the DSM-5 uses the more descriptive terms lip biting and cheek chewing (p. 263) instead of morsicatio buccarum.

== Treatment ==
The lesions are harmless; no treatment is indicated beyond reassurance unless the person requests it. The most common and simple treatment is the construction of a specially made acrylic prosthesis that covers the biting surfaces of the teeth and protects the cheek, tongue, and labial mucosa (an occlusal splint). This is either employed in the short term as a habit-breaking intention or more permanently (e.g., wearing the prosthesis each night during sleep). Psychological intervention has also been attempted, with some studies reporting negative findings, while some individuals seem to benefit from behavioral procedures involving habit reversal training and decoupling.

== Epidemiology ==
This phenomenon is fairly common, with one in every 800 adults showing evidence of active lesions at any one time. It is more common in people who are experiencing stress or psychological conditions. The prevalence in females is double the prevalence in males, and it is two or three times more prevalent in people over the age of thirty-five.
