= Keratin pearl =

Layered keratin found in abnormal cells

A keratin pearl is a keratinized structure found in regions where abnormal squamous cells form concentric layers. Also called an epithelial pearl, due to a location among squamous cells of the epithelium, this type of structure is sometimes seen with squamous cell carcinoma.
