= Oral mucosa tissue engineering =

Tissue engineering of oral mucosa combines cells, materials and engineering to produce a three-dimensional reconstruction of oral mucosa. It is meant to simulate the real anatomical structure and function of oral mucosa. Tissue engineered oral mucosa shows promise for clinical use, such as the replacement of soft tissue defects in the oral cavity. These defects can be divided into two major categories: the gingival recessions (receding gums) which are tooth-related defects, and the non tooth-related defects. Non tooth-related defects can be the result of trauma, chronic infection or defects caused by tumor resection or ablation (in the case of oral cancer). Common approaches for replacing damaged oral mucosa are the use of autologous grafts and cultured epithelial sheets.

== Autologous grafts ==
Autologous grafts are used to transfer tissue from one site to another on the same body. The use of autologous grafts prevents transplantation rejection reactions. Grafts used for oral reconstruction are preferably taken from the oral cavity itself (such as gingival and palatal grafts). However, their limited availability and small size leads to the use of either skin transplants or intestinal mucosa to be able to cover bigger defects.

Other than tissue shortage, donor site morbidity is a common problem that may occur when using autologous grafts. When tissue is obtained from somewhere other than the oral cavity (such as the intestine or skin) there is a risk of the graft not being able to lose its original donor tissue characteristics. For example, skin grafts are often taken from the radial forearm or lateral upper arm when covering more extensive defects. A positive aspect of using skin grafts is the large availability of skin. However, skin grafts differ from oral mucosa in: consistency, color and keratinization pattern. The transplanted skin graft often continues to grow hair in the oral cavity.

== Normal oral mucosa ==
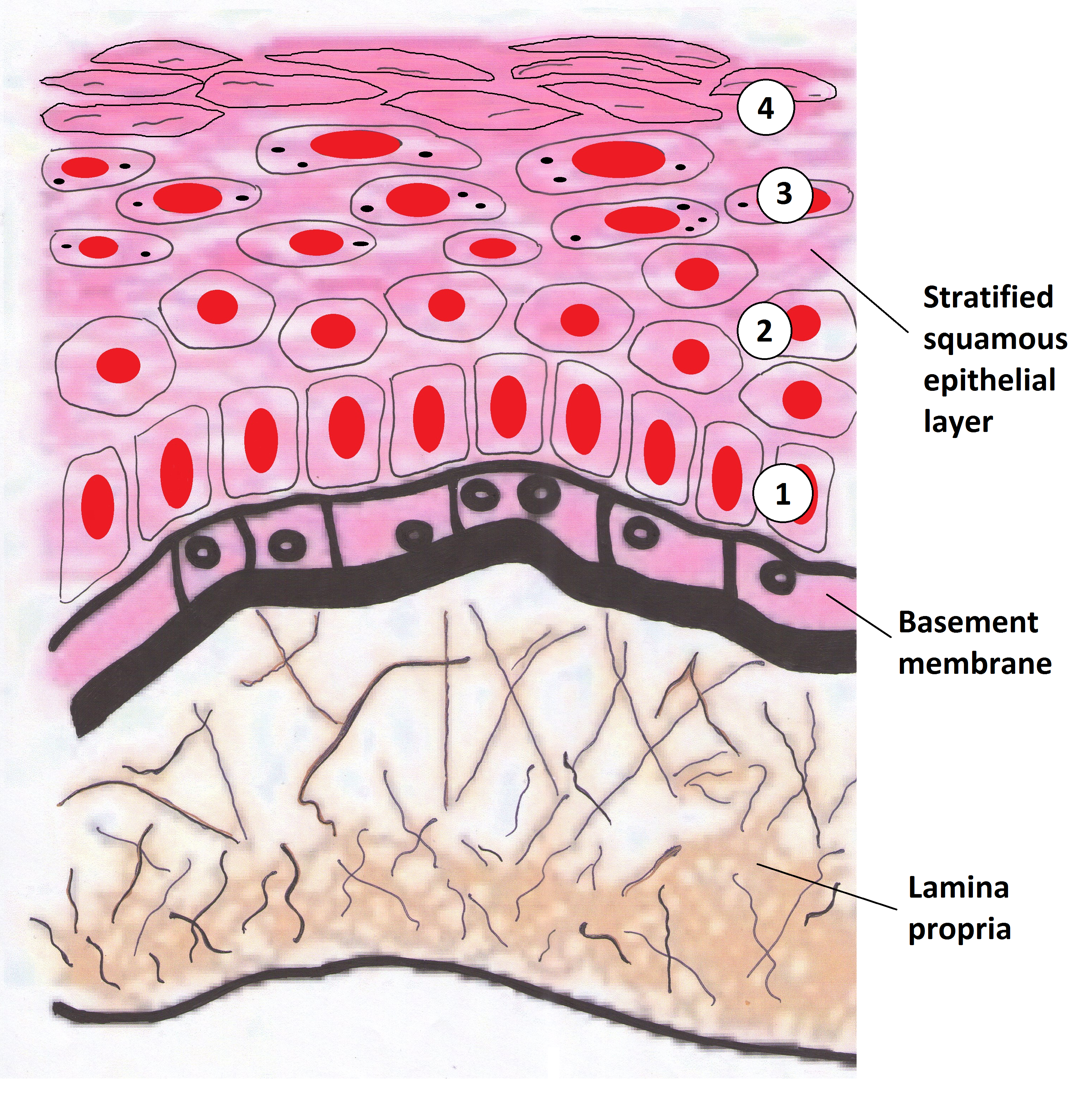
Schematic illustration of the layers in normal oral mucosa. 1: Stratum basale 2: Stratum spinosum 3: Stratum granulosum 4: Stratum corneum

To better understand the challenges for building full-thickness engineered oral mucosa it is important to first understand the structure of normal oral mucosa. Normal oral mucosa consists of two layers, the top stratified squamous epithelial layer and the bottom lamina propria. The epithelial layer consists of four layers:

- Stratum basale (basal layer)
- Stratum spinosum (spinous layer)
- Stratum granulosum (granular layer)
- Stratum corneum (keratinized/superficial layer)

Depending on the region of the mouth the epithelium may be keratinized or non-keratinized. Non-keratinized squamous epithelium covers the soft palate, lips, cheeks and the floor of the mouth. Keratinized squamous epithelium is present in the gingiva and hard palate. Keratinization is the differentiation of keratinocytes in the granular layer into dead surface cells to form the stratum corneum. The cells terminally differentiate as they migrate to the surface (from the basal layer where the progenitor cells are located to the dead superficial surface). The lamina propria is a fibrous connective tissue layer that consists of a network of type I and III collagen and elastin fibers. The main cells of the lamina propria are the fibroblasts, which are responsible for the production of the extracellular matrix. The basement membrane forms the border between the epithelial layer and the lamina propria.

== Tissue engineered oral mucosa ==
=== Partial-thickness engineered oral mucosa ===
Cell culture techniques make it possible to produce epithelial sheets for the replacement of damaged oral mucosa. Partial-thickness tissue engineering uses one type of cell layer, this can be in monolayers or multilayers. Monolayer epithelial sheets suffice for the study of the basic biology of oral mucosa, for example its responses to stimuli such as mechanical stress, growth factor addition and radiation damage. Oral mucosa, however, is a complex multilayer structure with proliferating and differentiating cells and monolayer epithelial sheets have been shown to be fragile, difficult to handle and likely to contract without a supporting extracellular matrix. Monolayer epithelial sheets can be used to manufacture multilayer cultures. These multilayer epithelial sheets show signs of differentiation such as the formation of a basement membrane and keratinization. Fibroblasts are the most common cells in extracellular matrix and are important for epithelial morphogenesis. If fibroblasts are absent from the matrix, the epithelium stops proliferating but continues to differentiate. The structures obtained by partial-thickness oral mucosa engineering form the basis for full-thickness oral mucosa engineering.

=== Full-thickness tissue engineered oral mucosa ===
With the advancement of tissue engineering an alternative approach was developed: the full-thickness engineered oral mucosa. Full-thickness engineered oral mucosa is a better simulation of the in vivo situation because they take the anatomical structure of native oral mucosa into account. Problems, such as tissue shortage and donor site morbidity, do not occur when using full-thickness engineered oral mucosa.

The main goal when producing full-thickness engineered oral mucosa is to make it resemble normal oral mucosa as much as possible. This is achieved by using a combination of different cell types and scaffolds.

- Lamina propria: is mimicked by seeding oral fibroblasts, producing extracellular matrix, into a biocompatible (porous) scaffold and culturing them in a fibroblast differentiation medium.
- Basement membrane: containing type IV collagen, laminin, fibronectin and integrins. Ideally, the basement membrane must contain a lamina lucida and a lamina densa.
- Stratified squamous epithelium: is simulated by oral keratinocytes cultured in a medium containing keratinocyte growth factors such as the epidermal growth factor (EGF).

To obtain the best results, the type and origin of the fibroblasts and keratinocytes used in oral mucosa tissue engineering are important factors to hold into account. Fibroblasts are usually taken from the dermis of the skin or oral mucosa. Kertinocytes can be isolated from different areas of the oral cavity (such as the palate or gingiva). It is important that the fibroblasts and keratinocytes are used in the earliest stage possible as the function of these cells decreases with time. The transplanted keratinocytes and fibroblasts should adapt to their new environment and adopt their function. There is a risk of losing the transplanted tissue if the cells do not adapt properly. This adaptation goes more smoothly when the donor tissue cells resemble the cells of the native tissue.

== Scaffolds ==
A scaffold or matrix serves as a temporary supporting structure (extracellular matrix), the initial architecture, on which the cells can grow three-dimensionally into the desired tissue. A scaffold must provide the environment needed for cellular growth and differentiation; it must provide the strength to withstand mechanical stress and guide their growth. Moreover, scaffolds should be biodegradable and degrade at the same rate as the tissue regenerates to be optimally replaced by the host tissue. There are numerous scaffolds to choose from and when choosing a scaffold biocompatibility, porosity and stability should also be held into account. Available scaffolds for oral mucosa tissue engineering are:

=== Naturally derived scaffolds ===
- Acellular Dermis. An acellular dermis is made by removing the cells (epidermis and dermal fibroblasts) from split-thickness skin. It has two sides: one side has a basal lamina suitable for the epithelial cells, and the other is suitable for fibroblast infiltration because it has intact vessel channels. It is durable, able to keep its structure and does not trigger immune reactions (non-immunogenic).
- Amniotic Membrane. The amniotic membrane, the inner part of the placenta, has a thick basement membrane of collagen type IV and laminin and avascular connective tissue.

=== Fibroblast-populated skin substitutes ===
Fibroblast-populated Skin Substitutes are scaffolds which contain fibroblasts that are able to proliferate and produce extracellular matrix and growth factors within 2 to 3 weeks. This creates a matrix similar to that of a dermis. Commercially available types are for example:

- Dermagraft
- Apligraf
- Orcel
- Polyactive
- Hyalograf 3D

=== Gelatin-based scaffolds ===
Gelatin is the denatured form of collagen. Gelatin possesses several advantages for tissue-engineering application: they attract fibroblasts, are non-immunogenic, easy to manipulate and boost the formation of epithelium. There are three types of gelatin-based scaffolds:

- Gelatin-oxidized dextran matrix
- Gelatin-chitosan-oxidized dextran matrix
- Gelatin-glucan matrix
- Gelatin-hyaluronate matrix
- Gelatin-chitosan hyaluronic acid matrix.

Glucan is a polysaccharide with antibacterial, antiviral and anticoagulant properties. Hyaluronic acid is added to improve the biological and mechanical properties of the matrix.

=== Collagen-based scaffolds ===
==== Pure collagen scaffolds ====
Collagen is the primary component of the extracellular matrix. Collagen scaffolds efficiently support fibroblast growth, which in turn allows keratinocytes to grow nicely into multilayers. Collagen (mainly collagen type I) is often used as a scaffold because it is biocompatible, non-immunogenic and available. However, collagen biodegrades relatively rapidly and is not good at withstanding mechanical forces. Improved characteristics can be created by cross-linking collagen-based matrices: this is an effective method to correct the instability and mechanical properties.

==== Compound collagen scaffolds ====
Compound collagen-based scaffolds have been developed in an attempt to improve the function of these scaffolds for tissue engineering. An example of a compound collagen scaffold is the collagen-chitosan matrix. Chitosan is a polysaccharide that is chemically similar to cellulose. Unlike collagen, chitosan biodegrades relatively slowly. However, chitosan is not very biocompatible with fibroblasts. To improve the stability of scaffolds containing gelatin or collagen and the biocompatibility of chitosan is made by crosslinking the two; they compensate for each other's shortcomings.

Collagen-elastine membrane, collagen-glycosaminoglycane (C-GAG) matrix, cross-linked collagen matrix Integra and Terudermis are other examples of compound collagen scaffolds.

Allogeneic cultured keratinocytes and fibroblasts in bovine collagen (Gintuit) is the first cell-based product made from allogeneic human cells and bovine collagen approved by the US Food and Drug Administration (FDA). It is an allogeneic cellularized scaffold product and was approved for medical use in the United States in March 2012.

=== Fibrin-based scaffolds ===
Fibrin-based scaffolds contain fibrin which gives the keratinocytes stability. Moreover, they are simple to reproduce and handle.

=== Hybrid scaffolds ===
A hybrid scaffold is a skin substitute based on a combination of synthetic and natural materials. Examples of hybrid scaffolds are HYAFF and Laserskin. These hybrid scaffolds have been shown to have good in-vitro and in-vivo biocompatibilities and their biodegradability is controllable.

=== Synthetic scaffolds ===
The use of natural materials in scaffolds has its disadvantages. Usually, they are expensive, not available in large quantities and they have the risk of disease transmission. This has led to the development of synthetic scaffolds. When producing synthetic scaffolds there is full control over their properties. For example, they can be made to have good mechanical properties and the right biodegradability. When it comes to synthetic scaffolds thickness, porosity and pore size are important factors for controlling connective tissue formation. Examples of synthetic scaffolds are:

- Polyethylene terephthalate membranes (PET membranes)
- Polycarbonate-permeable membranes (PC membranes)
- Porous polylactic glycolic acid (PLGA)

Historical use of electrospinning to produce synthetic scaffolds dates back to at least the late 1980s when Simon showed that technology could be used to produce nano- and submicron-scale fibrous scaffolds from polymer solutions specifically intended for use as in vitro cell and tissue substrates. This early use of electrospun lattices for cell culture and tissue engineering showed that various cell types would adhere to and proliferate upon polycarbonate fibers. It was noted that as opposed to the flattened morphology typically seen in 2D culture, cells grown on the electrospun fibers exhibited a more rounded 3-dimensional morphology generally observed of tissues in vivo.

== Clinical applications: full-thickness engineered oral mucosa ==
Although it has not yet been commercialized for clinical use clinical studies have been done on intra- and extra-oral treatments with full-thickness engineered oral mucosa. Full-thickness engineered oral mucosa is mainly used in maxillofacial reconstructive surgery and periodontal peri-implant reconstruction. Good clinical and histological results have been obtained. For example, there is vascular ingrowth and the transplanted keratinocytes integrate well into the native epithelium. Full-thickness engineered oral mucosa has also shown good results for extra-oral applications such as urethral reconstruction, ocular surface reconstruction and eyelid reconstruction.
