= Smokeless tobacco keratosis =

- Other names: Snuff dippers' keratosis, smokeless tobacco-associated keratosis, snuff pouch, snuff dipper's lesion, tobacco pouch keratosis, spit tobacco keratosis
- Specialty: Dentistry

Smokeless tobacco keratosis (STK) is a condition which develops on the oral mucosa (the lining of the mouth) in response to smokeless tobacco use. Generally it appears as a white patch, located at the point where the tobacco is held in the mouth. The condition usually disappears once the tobacco habit is stopped. It is associated with slightly increased risk of mouth cancer.

There are many types of smokeless tobacco. Chewing tobacco is shredded, air-cured tobacco with flavoring. Dipping tobacco ("moist snuff") is air or fire-cured, finely cut tobacco. Dry snuff is ground or pulverised tobacco leaves. In the Indian subcontinent, the Middle-East and South-East Asia, tobacco may be combined in a quid or paan with other ingredients such as betel leaf, Areca nut and slaked lime. Use of Areca nut is associated with oral submucous fibrosis. An appearance termed Betel chewer's mucosa describes morsicatio buccarum with red-staining of mucosa due to betel quid ingredients. In Scandinavian countries, snus, a variant of dry snuff, is sometimes used. In the United States of America, the most common form of smokeless tobacco is dipping tobacco, although chewing tobacco is sometimes used by outdoor workers and dry snuff is common among females in the Southern states. The overall prevalence of smokeless tobacco use in the USA is about 4.5%, but this is higher in Mid-Western and Southern states.

== Signs and symptoms ==
STK typically occurs in the buccal sulcus (inside the cheek) or the labial sulcus (between the lips and the teeth) and corresponds to the site where the tobacco is held in the mouth. It is painless.

The appearance of the lesion is variable depending upon the type of tobacco used, and the frequency and duration of use. It takes about 1-5 years of smokeless tobacco use for the lesion to appear. Early lesions may appear as thin, translucent and granular or wrinkled mucosa. The later lesion may appear thicker, more opaquely white and hyperkeratotic with fissures and folds. Oral snuff causes more pronounced changes in the oral mucosa than tobacco chewing. Snuff dipping is associated more with verrucous keratosis.

As well as the white changes of the oral mucosa, there may be gingival recession (receding gums) and staining of tooth roots in the area where the tobacco is held.

== Diagnosis ==
Diagnosis is mainly clinical, based on the history and clinical appearance. The differential diagnosis includes other oral white lesions such as Leukoplakia, squamous cell carcinoma, oral candidiasis, lichen planus, white sponge nevus and contact stomatitis. In contrast to pseudomembraneous candidiasis, this white patch cannot be wiped off. Tissue biopsy is sometimes carried out to rule out other lesions, although biopsy is not routinely carried out for this condition.

== Treatment ==
Apart from stopping the habit, no other treatment is indicated. Long term follow-up is usually carried out. Some recommend biopsy if the lesions persists more than 6 weeks after giving up smokeless tobacco use, or if the lesion undergoes a change in appearance (e.g. ulceration, thickening, color changes, especially to speckled white and red or entirely red). Surgical excision may be carried out if the lesion does not resolve.

== Prognosis ==
Usually this lesion is reversible if the tobacco habit is stopped completely, even after many years of use. In one report, 98% of lesions disappeared within 2 weeks of stopping tobacco use. The risk of the lesion developing into oral cancer (generally squamous cell carcinoma and its variant verrucous carcinoma) is relatively low. Indeed, veruccous carcinoma is sometimes term "snuff dipper's cancer". In most reported cases, malignant transformation has occurring in individuals with a very long history of chewing tobacco or who use dry snuff.

Smokeless tobacco use is also accompanied by increased risk of other oral conditions such as dental caries (tooth decay), periodontitis (gum disease), attrition (tooth wear) and staining.

== Epidemiology ==
STK is extremely common among smokeless tobacco users. Given the association with smokeless tobacco use, this condition tends to occur in adults. A national USA survey estimated an overall prevalence of 1.5% of all types of smokeless tobacco lesions, with males affected more commonly than females.

== See also ==
- Stomatitis nicotina
- Smoker's melanosis
