= Drug-related gingival hyperplasia =

- Specialty: Dermatology

Drug-related gingival hyperplasia is a cutaneous condition characterized by enlargement of the gums noted during the first year of drug treatment. Although the mechanism of drug related gingival hyperplasia is not well understood, some risk factors for the condition include the duration of drug use and poor oral hygiene. In most cases, alternative drugs are given, in order to avoid this side effect.

== See also ==
- Desquamative gingivitis
- List of cutaneous conditions
