= Smoker's melanosis =

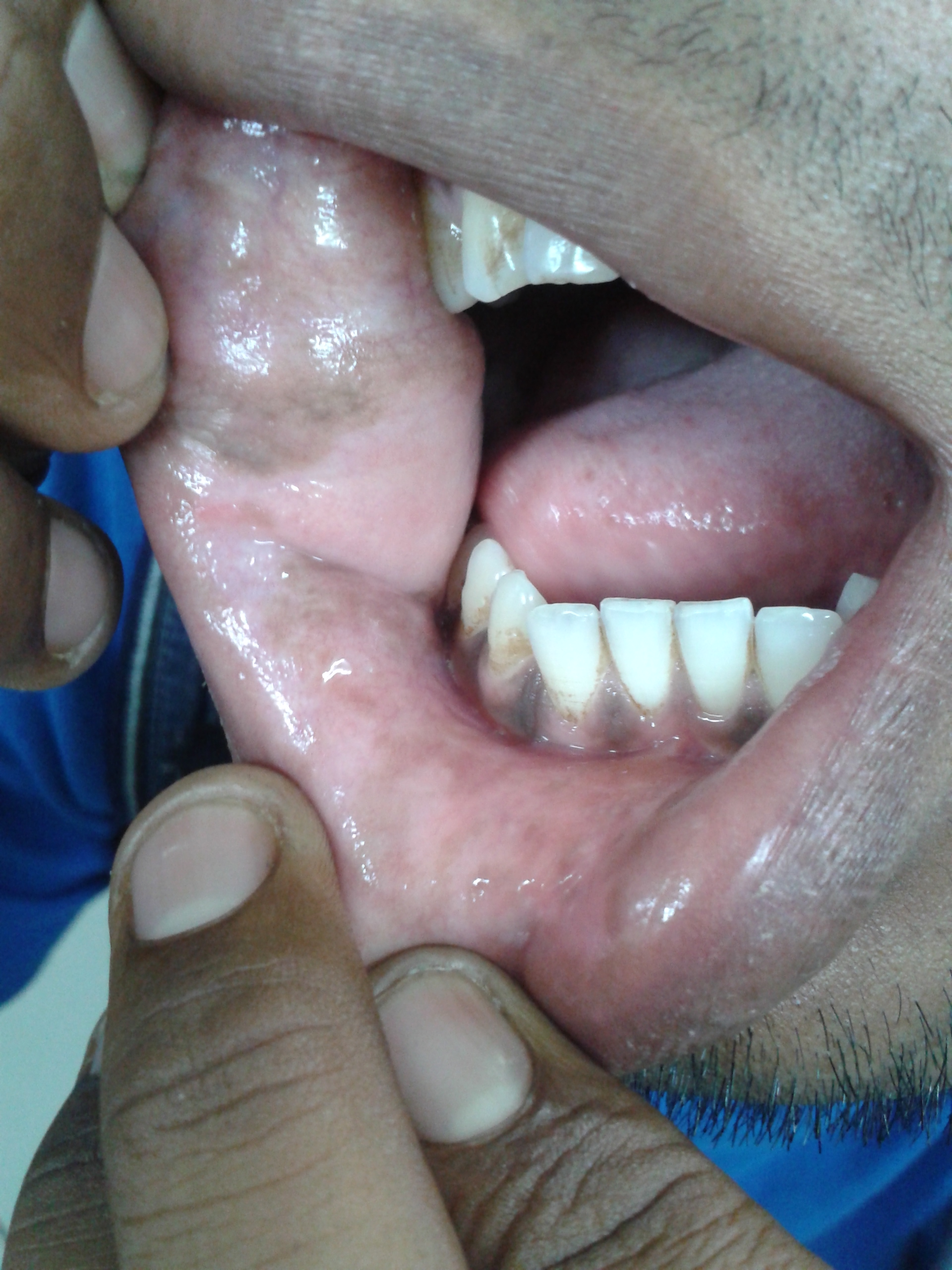
- Smoker's melanosis in gums base

Smoker's melanosis is seen with the naked eye as a brown to black pigmentation of the oral tissue i.e. the gums, cheeks or palate as well as in the larynx. It is most often seen in the lower labial gingiva of tobacco users. Most easily it is found in white race, due to their lack of genetically caused melanin pigmentation.

The brown to black colour is melanin. In the skin, melanin prevents harmful UV-light from reaching deeper, sensible parts of the tissue. If UV-light penetrates deeply, some of the toxic substances caused by UV-light damage to cells are bound to melanin in the epithelial cells and travel with the ageing cells to the skin surface, where they are expelled from the tissue surface. In this way the melanocytes and keratinocytes together protect the tissue, with melanin serving as a toxic defence and cleaning agent.

In the oral mucosa, where the ageing epithelial cells move faster to the surface compared to skin, a similar defence-mechanism seems to be present, cleaning the mucosa from different toxic chemicals penetrating the epithelium. Besides chemicals in tobacco also antimalaria-drugs cause an oral pigmentation. Smoker's melanosis is like the genetic melanin pigmentations, a defence-system in action.

The microscope shows a smoker's melanosis to be characterized by a melanin hyperpigmentation of the lower part of the oral epithelium, similar to sun-tanned skin. The hyperpigmentation consists of melanin granules which have the shape and colour of "coffea beans". They are produced by the dendritic, octopus-like melanocytes, seen between the epithelial cells situated closest to the epithelium/connective tissue border.

In tobacco-users the melanocytes are stimulated to produce melanin granules and to distribute them out to the surrounding epithelial cells for further transport to the mucosal surface, like the mechanism in melanin-pigmented skin.

Small amounts of melanin-like granules together with other electron-dense particles can also be seen within large melanosome complexes in the underlying connective tissue. If the granules derive from the epithelium, a phenomenon known as melanin incontinence, is not known. In Caucasians these granules are not expected to influence on the clinically observed degree of smoker's melanosis.

== Causes ==
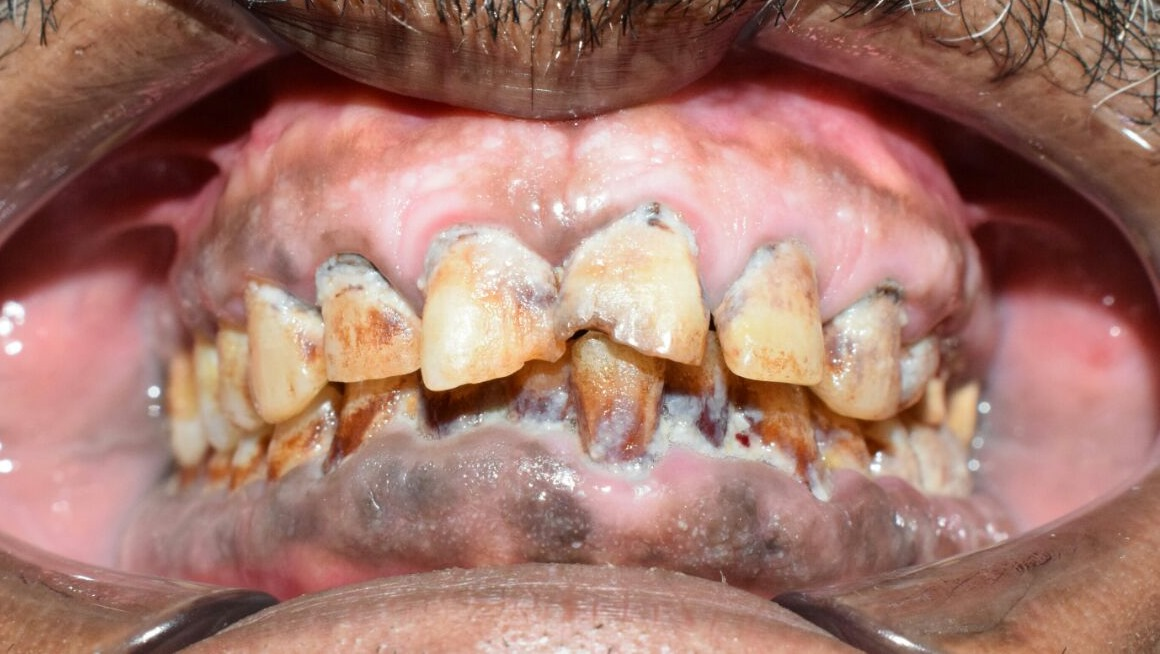
Smoker melanosis in a patient consuming 2 packs of cigarette per day

Smoking or the use of nicotine-containing drugs is the cause of Smoker's melanosis. Tar-components (benzopyrenes) are also known to stimulate melanocytes to melanin production, and other unknown toxic agents in tobacco may also be the cause. These chemical agents have a polycyclic, chain-like structure. Environmental tobacco smoke from parents is causing smoker's melanosis in their children Swedish snuff causes a small elevation of oral melanin pigmented individuals from 3.0% to 4.7%. Nicotine tablets have shown to stimulate melanin pigmentation of the oral mucosa.

== Treatment and prognosis ==
Lesions usually disappear between 3 months to 3 years for those who stop smoking. Smoker's melanosis is a benign, normal physiological reaction, and does not develop into cancer. If it does not disappear, however, a biopsy can verify the diagnosis. If a smoker's melanosis is destroyed by excessive smoking, as in the hard palate of reverse smokers, who smoke with the glowing part of the cigarette inside the mouth for different reasons, a pale depigmented surface is first seen, indicating the loss of the protecting melanin. Then a red inflammation sometimes occurs and cancer development may follow. In reverse smokers it is important to regularly inspect the areas with smoker's melanosis to detect any melanin destruction, in order to stop smoking in time and thus prevent cancer development.

== Epidemiology ==
A study in Sweden showed that 21.5% of smokers and 3% of nonsmokers (genetic pigmentation or unknown cause) had lesions that could be classified as an oral melanin pigmentation. A gingival melanin index in 4 degrees was established. Already with a consumption of 1-3 cigarettes a day 9.3% of all 20.333 examined showed a smoker's melanosis. Pipe smokers had smoker's melanosis in 16.8%. One year after the start of cigarette smoking a clinically visible smoker's melanosis could be seen in 12.3% of women, and 17% among men.

In cigarette smokers who quit smoking, the number of individuals with smoker's melanosis becomes slowly less frequent after 2–3 months, but can still be seen in a few former smokers three years after smoking stop.

Although clinically visible genetic melanin pigmentations in the mouth are present in several ethnic groups all over the world, more mucosal areas will be melanin-pigmentet if tobacco products are used. Smoker's melanosis is found in India, Italy, Japan, Nigeria, Sweden, Turkey, USA, and several other countries.

Smoker's melanosis is expected to be found also in other tissue surfaces exposed to tobacco and tobacco smoke, for instance lips and in skin of the fingers holding the cigarette. Future studies will also show if the use of tobacco exaggerates the pigmentation of skin.

== Gallery ==
Possible smoker's melanosis. Discoloured skin on finger. Area close to cigarette glow.

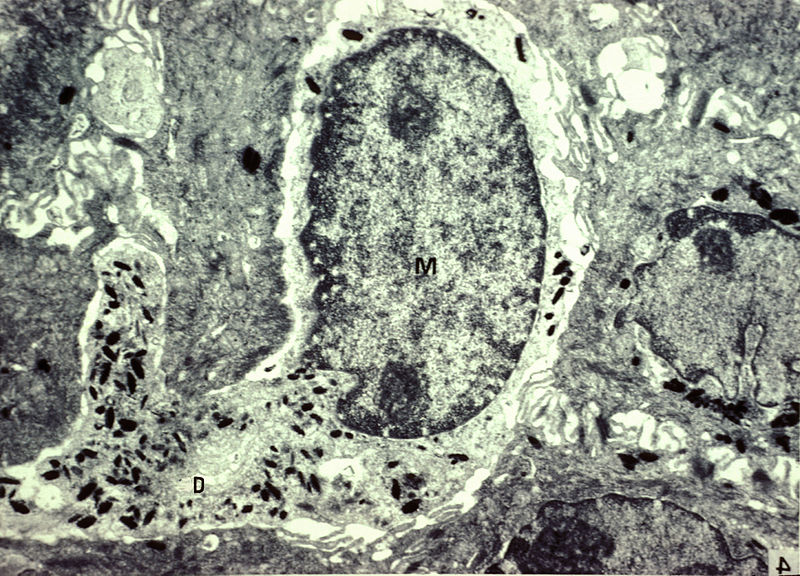
Melanocyte with melanin granules in dendrite. PMID 6200593

Melanocytes in basal cells of a smoker's gum

Melanin granules in the basal epithelium under light microscope

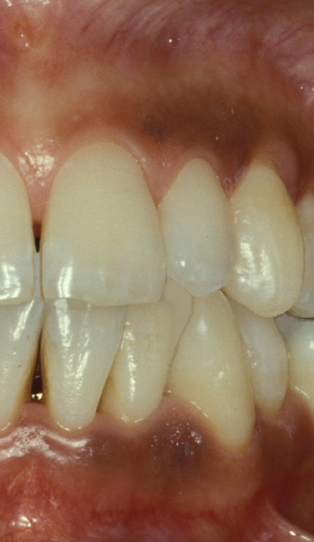
Smoker's melanosis in upper and lower gums

== See also ==
- Melanosis coli
- Peutz–Jeghers syndrome
- Stomatitis nicotina
- Smokeless tobacco keratosis
