= Nagayama's spots =

Medical sign

- Specialty: Dermatology

Nagayama's spots are enanthem of red papules on the soft palate. It is seen in roseola also known as roseola infantum, a viral disease caused by HHV6 and HHV7.

== See also ==
- Oral florid papillomatosis
- Roseola infantum
