= Giant condyloma acuminatum =

- Other names: Giant condyloma of Buschke–Löwenstein tumor
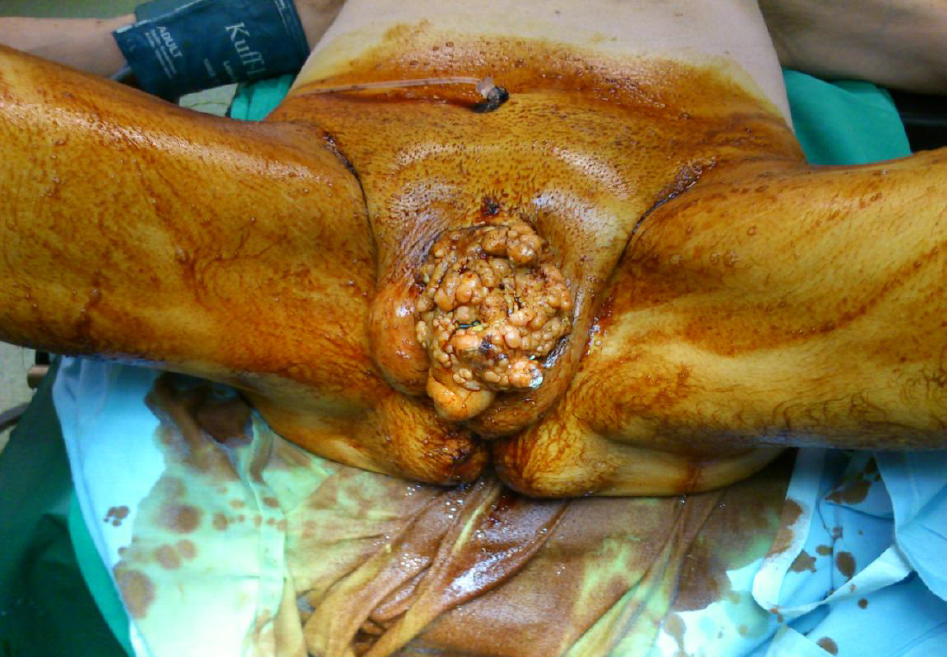
- Man, aged 63, with a massive cauliflower-like penile mass with several urinary fistulae making the penile shaft indistinguishable.
- Specialty: Infectious diseases

Giant condyloma acuminatum (also known as a Buschke–Löwenstein tumor) is a rare cutaneous condition characterized by an aggressive, wart-like growth that is a verrucous carcinoma. It is attributed to human papillomavirus.

Due to their size, these tumors can be locally invasive and destructive. Owing to their impressive growth patterns, Buschke–Löwenstein tumors displace and destroy adjacent structures from compression. In general, these masses are benign, but the potential for malignant transformation to squamous cell carcinoma exists in the long term, as does the rare risk for metastasis. Buschke–Löwensteoin tumors are frequently associated with HPV subtypes 6 and 11.

Treatment involves surgical resection and possible chemoradiotherapy. Although penile sparing is the goal, total penectomy may be required. They have high recurrence rates; therefore, close follow-up is crucial.

== See also ==
- List of cutaneous conditions
- List of verrucous carcinoma subtypes
