= Pseudoepitheliomatous keratotic and micaceous balanitis =

- Specialty: Dermatology

Pseudoepitheliomatous keratotic and micaceous balanitis, (PKMB) is a cutaneous condition characterized by skin lesions on the glans penis that are wart-like with scaling. It can present as a cutaneous horn. PKMB is usually asymptomatic, with occasional irritation, burning sensation, fissuring, or maceration.

PKMB, possibly a type of pyodermatitis, is believed to be caused by a pseudoepitheliomatous reaction to infection. It progresses through four stages: early plaque, late tumor, verrucous carcinoma, and squamous cell carcinoma and invasion.

The histological examination reveals a non-specific dermal inflammatory infiltration, lymphocytes and eosinophils, hyperkeratosis, parakeratosis, acanthosis, elongated rete ridges, and mild lower epidermal dysplasia. PKMB is differentiated from other male genitalia diseases like giant condyloma, squamous cell carcinoma, psoriasis, and Queyrat erythroplasia.

Treatment for plaque lesion depends on the stage, with topical therapy for early plaques and aggressive therapy for advanced ones. When there is no cancer indication, cryotherapy and topical 5-flourouracil are recommended. Extensive surgical excision is needed for atypia-related features.

New research reveals PKMB, once considered benign, is a unique entity with a histologic spectrum ranging from verrucous carcinoma to hypertrophic-hyperplastic penile dystrophy, with low-grade malignant potential and potential for aggressive or local invasive tendencies.

== Signs and symptoms ==
PKMB manifests as a densely adherent micaceous scaling on top of a thick hyperkeratotic plaque. While there may be occasional signs of irritation, burning sensation, fissuring, or maceration, PKMB is usually asymptomatic. There are situations where the thickness of the plaque is so thick that it gives the appearance of a penile horn. When micturition occurs, hyperkeratotic plaques involving the perimeatal skin may result in several urine streams, producing the appearance of a "watering-can penis."

== Causes ==
It is unknown exactly what causes PKMB. It's thought to be a pseudoepitheliomatous reaction to infection or a type of pyodermatitis.

== Mechanism ==
There are four stages in the pathogenesis of PKMB: the early plaque stage, the late tumor stage, verrucous carcinoma, and the transformation to squamous cell carcinoma and invasion.

== Diagnosis ==
The histological examination reveals a non-specific dermal inflammatory infiltration consisting of lymphocytes and eosinophils, together with hyperkeratosis, parakeratosis, acanthosis, elongated rete ridges, and mild lower epidermal dysplasia.

Differential diagnosis of PKMB includes other diseases on male genitalia-like giant condyloma, squamous cell carcinoma, psoriasis, and erythroplasia of Queyrat.

== Treatment ==
The course of treatment depends on the stage of the lesion; topical therapy is necessary for the early plaque stage, while more aggressive therapy is required for the advanced stages. When there is no histological indication of cancer, cryotherapy and topical 5-flourouracil are the recommended courses of treatment. When there are atypia-related features, extensive surgical excision is necessary to achieve both satisfactory cosmetic and functional outcomes.

== Outlook ==
PKMB was once thought to be a completely benign illness, but new research has revealed that it is actually a unique entity that spans a histologic spectrum from verrucous carcinoma to hypertrophic-hyperplastic penile dystrophy. The lesion should be regarded as having low-grade or limited malignant potential, as it may exhibit aggressive or locally invasive tendencies.

== See also ==
- Balanitis
- Balanitis plasmacellularis
