= Papillomatosis cutis carcinoides =

- Other names: Gottron's carcinoid papillomatosis and Papillomatosis cutis carcinoides of Gottron–Eisenlohr
- Specialty: Dermatology

Papillomatosis cutis carcinoides, also known as Gottron's carcinoid papillomatosis and papillomatosis cutis carcinoides of Gottron–Eisenlohr, is a cutaneous condition characterized by verrucous skin lesions, and is due to an HPV infection of the skin.

== See also ==
- Verrucous carcinoma
- List of verrucous carcinoma subtypes
