= Residual body =

In lysosomal digestion, residual bodies are vesicles containing indigestible materials. Residual bodies are either secreted by the cell via exocytosis (this generally only occurs in macrophages), or they become lipofuscin granules that remain in the cytosol indefinitely. Longer-living cells like neurons and muscle cells usually have a higher concentration of lipofuscin than other more rapidly proliferating cells.

== See also ==
- Autophagy
- Phagocytosis

== Sources ==
Karp, Gerald (2005). Cell and Molecular Biology: Concepts and Experiments. Hoboken, NJ: John Wiley & Sons. pp. 311–313. ISBN 0-471-46580-1.
