= Balanitis plasmacellularis =

- Other names: Balanitis circumscripta plasmacellularis, Zoon balanitis, and plasma cell balanitis.
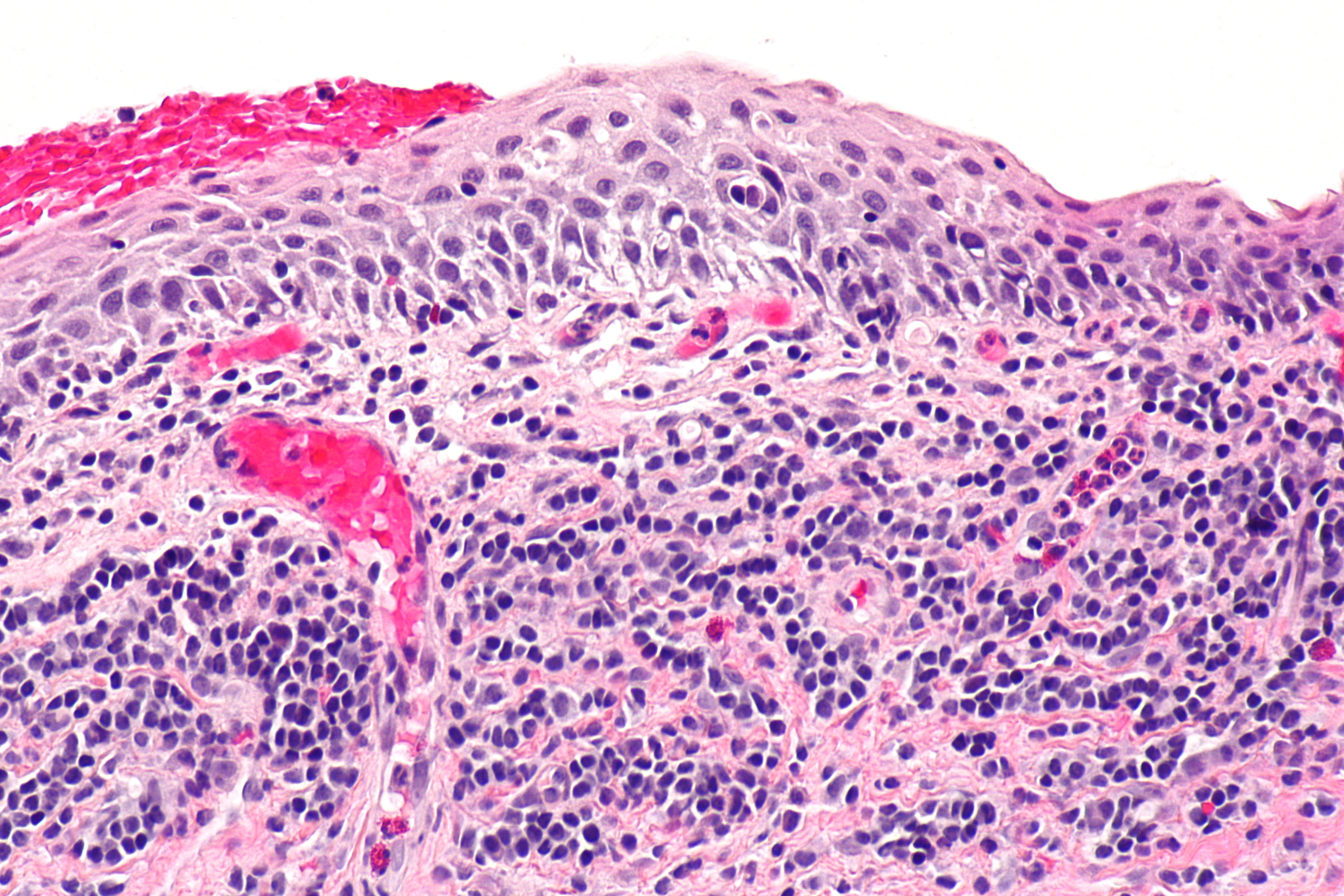
- Micrograph of plasmacytosis mucosae. H&E stain.
- Specialty: Dermatology

Balanitis plasmacellularis, also known as balanitis circumscripta plasmacellularis, Zoon balanitis, or plasma cell balanitis, is a cutaneous condition characterized by a benign inflammatory skin lesion characterized histologically by a plasma cell infiltrate.

Balanitis plasmacellularis is typically asymptomatic. It appears as an orange-red, moist, glossy macular to slightly elevated plaques. Balanitis plasmacellularis most commonly effects the glans penis.

The cause of balanitis plasmacellularis is unknown however heat friction and rubbing are possible contributing factors.

A biopsy is needed to make the diagnosis. Balanitis plasmacellularis can be managed with good hygiene and medications. Circumcision is curative.

Balanitis plasmacellularis is also known as Zoon balantitis, named after its discoverer Zoon.

A similar condition has been described in women (i.e. "Zoon's vulvitis"), although its existence is controversial due to the possibility of diagnostic error in many of the cases that have been reported in the medical literature.

== Signs and symptoms ==
The patient typically just exhibits a change in genital look and no other symptoms. On the other hand, symptoms including pruritus, dysuria, discomfort, and a burning sensation may occasionally accompany it. Rarely, reports of dyspareunia or blood-stained discharge have been made.

Balanitis plasmacellularis appears as one or more orange-red, glossy, moist, glistening, well-circumscribed, macular to slightly elevated plaque(s). Due to microhemorrhage and hemosiderin deposition, there may be several pinpoint, brighter red spots scattered across the orange-red plaque's backdrop. These spots are referred to as "cayenne pepper spots." On regions that are in close proximity to the lesions, prepuce occasionally exhibits "kissing lesions." These could then deteriorate and leave a "rusty stain" in their wake.

The glans penis is where it is most frequently found, however it can also affect the coronal sulcus and prepuce's inner surface. Similar lesions can afflict the female genitalia, particularly the labia minora. The conjunctiva, urethra, cheeks, epiglottis, and oral mucosa (gingiva, hard palate, and buccal mucosa) are additional locations.

== Causes ==
This condition's etiology and pathogenesis are currently unknown. Since it primarily affects uncircumcised men, discomfort from urine retention and smegma in the setting of "dysfunctional prepuce" is assumed to be the cause, which can result in poor genital hygiene and recurrent local infections. Furthermore, there's a chance that heat, friction, shock, and continuous rubbing are contributing factors. Therefore, the two most significant initiating causes are the mucosa's ongoing exposure to humid conditions and chronic irritation.

== Diagnosis ==
A biopsy is required to confirm the presumed clinical diagnosis. Histological alterations affecting the dermal vasculature and epidermis are typically identifiable. Pathological characteristics can include spongiosis, rete ridge loss, and epidermal atrophy. Single supra-basal layer epidermal cells have been characterized as lozenge or diamond-shaped keratinocytes. A dense inflammatory infiltrate of mostly plasma cells beneath the epidermis and an increase in vertically oriented capillaries are possible additional pathogenic signs. Additionally, erythrocyte extravasation and hemosiderin deposition are frequently seen. Notably, there is an absence of keratinocyte dysplasia and frank vesiculation.

== Treatment ==
Encouraging proper hygiene is a simple and maybe helpful action. Patients should be taught to gently clean their entire preputial sac, glans, and foreskin as well as to retract the foreskin on a frequent basis.

Medical management of balanitis plasmacellularis includes topical steroids, topical tacrolimus ointment, topical pimecrolimus 1% cream, and imiquimod. Circumcision is the only definite treatment of balanitis plasmacellularis.

== History ==
Zoon initially identified this phenomenon in eight male patients suffering from persistent balanitis in 1952. Zoon dubbed this ailment "balanoposthite chronique circonscrite bénigne á plasmocytes" or "balanitis chronica circumscripta plasmacellularis" and regarded it as a separate entity because all of these patients shared identical histological findings. Similar vulva sores were observed by Garnier in 1954. Later, Kortnig found the same lesion in the conjunctiva, while Nikolowski reported seeing it in the oral mucosa.

Watchorn et al have suggested the condition may not be a distinct clinicopathological entity.

== See also ==
- Balanitis
- Pseudoepitheliomatous keratotic and micaceous balanitis
