= List of verrucous carcinoma subtypes =

Verrucous carcinoma is a type of squamous cell carcinoma that may be associated with HPV infection (may be subtypes 16 or 18, but types 6 and 11 have also been reported, as have HPV negative variants). Several subtypes of verrucous carcinoma have been described. Treatment of verrucous carcinoma with radiation therapy should be avoided due to the risk of anaplastic transformation.

Subtypes of verrucous carcinoma
| Subtype | Clinical features |
|---|---|
| Epithelioma cuniculatum (Ackerman tumor, Carcinoma cuniculatum) | Arises on the sole of the foot from wart |
| Giant condyloma of Buschke–Löwenstein tumor (Buschke–Löwenstein tumor, Giant condyloma acuminatum) | Genitals affected |
| Oral florid papillomatosis | |
| Subungual keratoacanthoma | Occurs in the setting of immunosuppression or with epidermolytic hyperkeratosis; May erupt in the setting of systemic lupus erythematosus |
| Gottron's carcinoid papillomatosis (Papillomatosis cutis carcinoides, Papillomatosis cutis carcinoides of Gottron–Eisenlohr) | |

== See also ==
- List of cutaneous conditions
- List of contact allergens
- List of cutaneous conditions associated with increased risk of nonmelanoma skin cancer
- List of cutaneous conditions associated with internal malignancy
- List of cutaneous conditions caused by mutations in keratins
- List of cutaneous conditions caused by problems with junctional proteins
- List of dental abnormalities associated with cutaneous conditions
- List of genes mutated in cutaneous conditions
- List of histologic stains that aid in diagnosis of cutaneous conditions
- List of immunofluorescence findings for autoimmune bullous conditions
- List of inclusion bodies that aid in diagnosis of cutaneous conditions
- List of keratins expressed in the human integumentary system
- List of radiographic findings associated with cutaneous conditions
- List of specialized glands within the human integumentary system
- List of target antigens in pemphigoid
- List of target antigens in pemphigus
