= Balanitis =

Inflammation of the glans penis

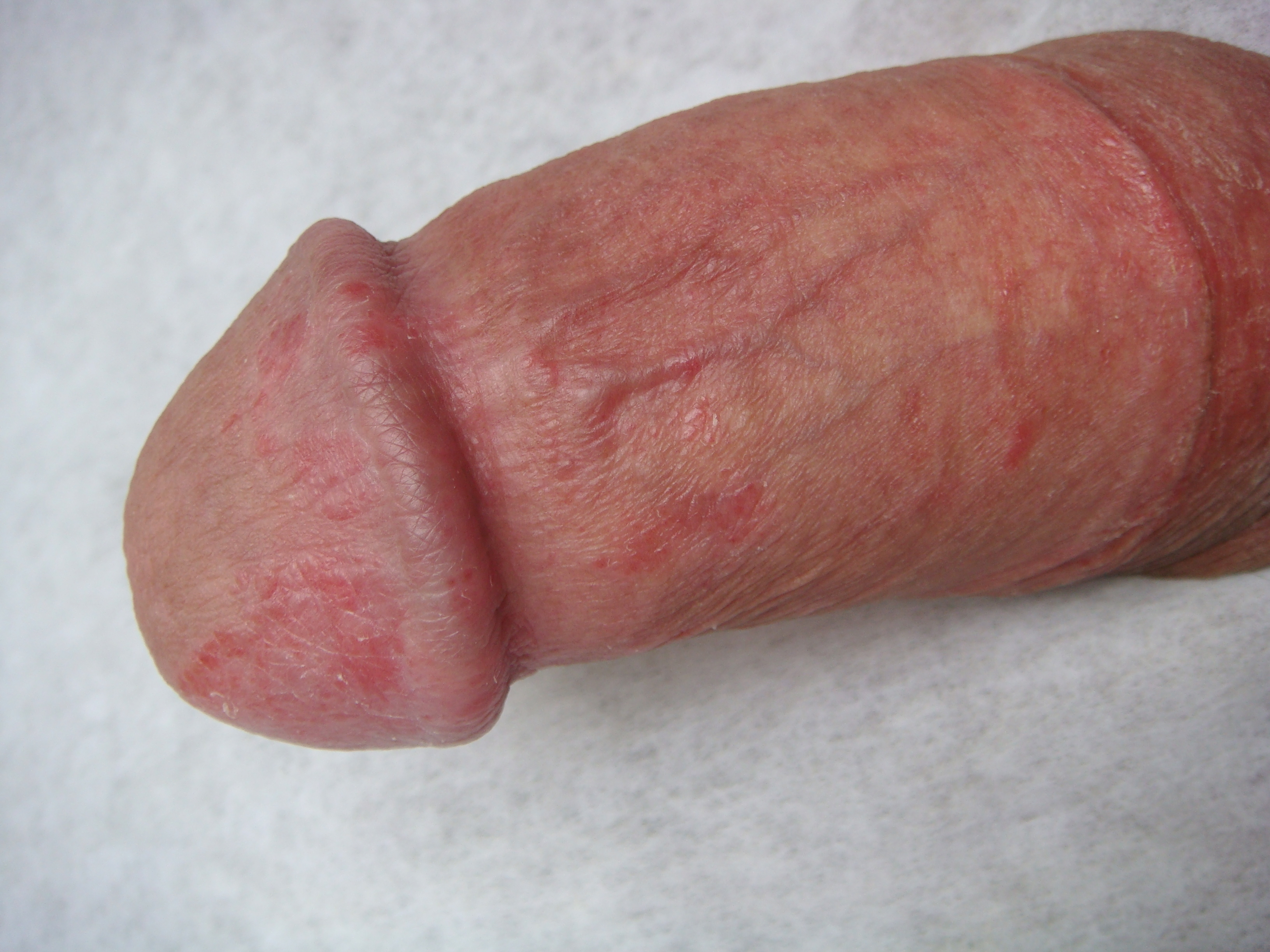
- Inflammation of the glans penis and the remaining preputial mucosa of a circumcised penis
- Specialty: Urology

Balanitis is inflammation of the glans penis. Balanoposthitis is the proper term when the foreskin is also affected. Balanitis occurring in males wearing diapers should be distinguished from redness caused by ammoniacal dermatitis.

== Etymology ==
The word balanitis is from the Greek βάλανος balanos, literally meaning 'acorn' because of the similarity in shape to the glans penis. -Itis is a suffix from the Greek for 'inflammation'. Posthe is the Greek word meaning 'foreskin'.

== Signs and symptoms ==
- Small red erosions on the glans (first sign)
- Redness of the foreskin
- Redness of the penis
- Other rashes on the head of the penis
- Foul-smelling discharge
- Painful foreskin and penis

=== Complications ===
Recurrent bouts of balanitis may cause scarring of the preputial orifice; the reduced elasticity may lead to pathologic phimosis. Further complications may include:

- Stricture of urinary meatus
- Paraphimosis

== Causes ==
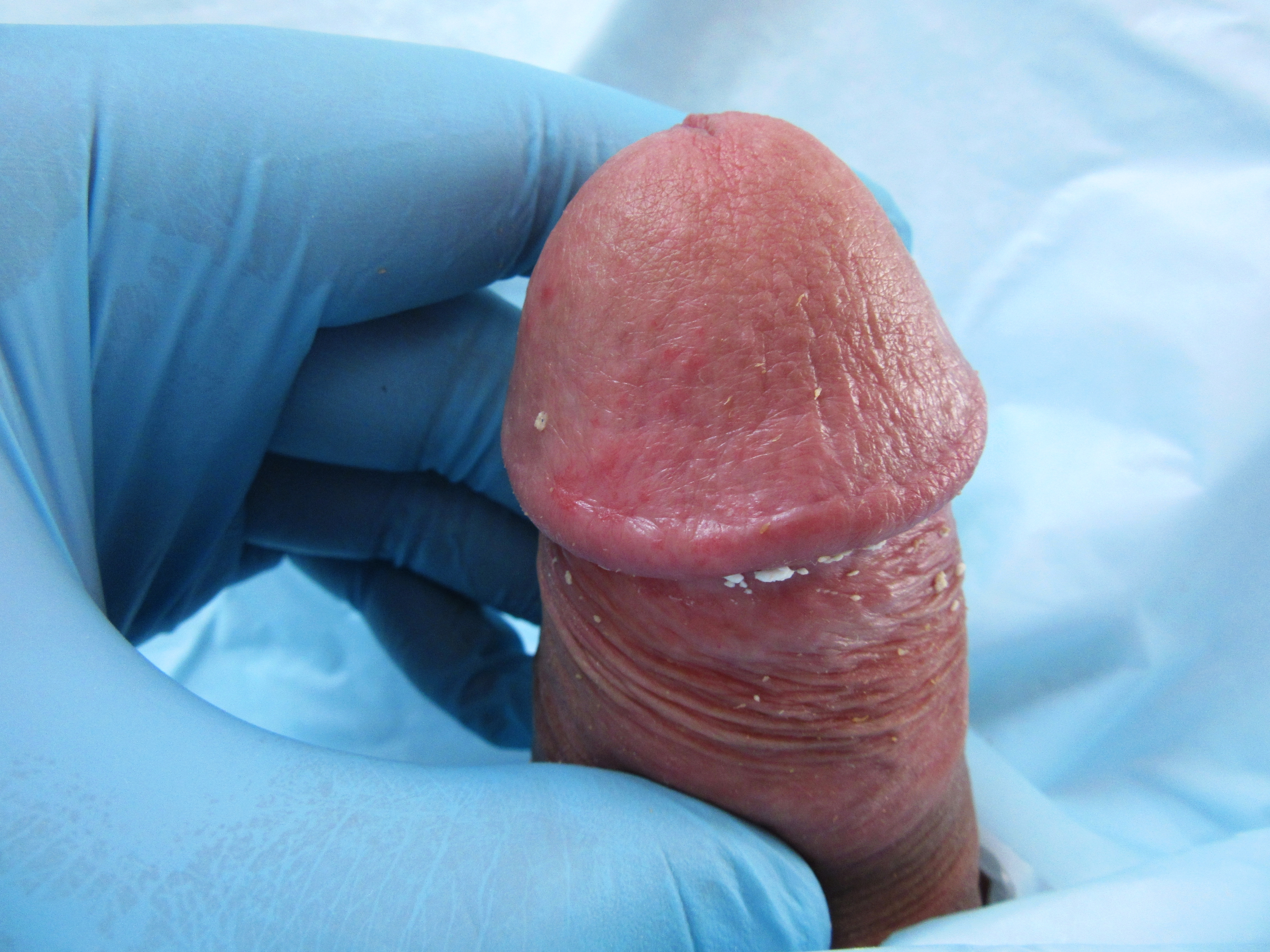
Balanitis caused by smegma

Inflammation has many possible causes, including irritation by environmental substances, certain medications, physical trauma, and infection such as bacterial, viral, or fungal. Some of these infections are sexually transmitted, however a yeast infection, Candida balanitis, is generally not categorized as such.

It is less common among males who are circumcised; in many cases, a dysfunction of the foreskin is a causal or contributing factor. Both not enough cleaning and too much cleaning can cause problems.

== Diagnosis ==
Diagnosis may include careful identification of the cause with the aid of a good patient history, swabs and cultures, and pathological examination of a biopsy.

=== Types ===
- Zoon's balanitis, also known as Balanitis Circumscripta Plasmacellularis or plasma cell balanitis (PCB), is an idiopathic, rare, benign penile dermatosis for which circumcision is often the preferred treatment. Zoon's balanitis has been successfully treated with the carbon dioxide laser; and more recently, Albertini and colleagues report the avoidance of circumcision and successful treatment of Zoon's balanitis with an Er:YAG laser. Another study, by Retamar and colleagues, found that 40 percent of those treated with CO_{2} laser relapsed.
- Circinate balanitis, also known as balanitis circinata, is a serpiginous annular dermatitis associated with reactive arthritis.
- Pseudoepitheliomatous keratotic and micaceous balanitis

== Treatment ==
Initial treatment in adults often involves simply pulling back the foreskin and cleaning the penis. However, some topical antibiotic and fungal ointments may be used for treatment for mild cases. Depending upon severity, hydrocortisone and other steroidal creams may be used upon consultation.

== Epidemiology ==
Balanitis is a common condition affecting 11% of adult men seen in urology clinics and 3% of children in the United States; globally, balanitis may occur in up to 3% of uncircumcised males.

== Other animals ==
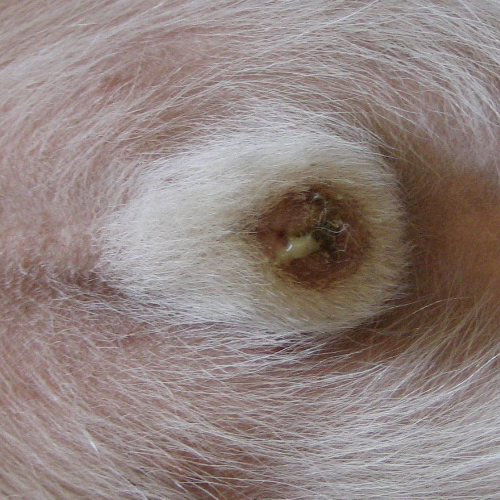
Prepuce of a dog affected by balanoposthitis

In dogs, balanoposthitis is caused by a disruption in the integumentary system, such as a wound or intrusion of a foreign body. A dog with this condition behaves normally, with the exception of excessive licking at the prepuce, and a yellow green, pus-like discharge is usually present.

In sheep (rams/wethers), ulcerative enzootic balanoposthitis is caused by the Corynebacterium renale group (C. renale, C. pilosum & C. cystidis).

For the condition in bulls, caused by a virus see Bovine herpesvirus 1.

Balanoposthitis is believed to have contributed to the decline to near-extinction of the marsupial Gilbert's potoroo.
