= Allogeneic cultured keratinocytes and fibroblasts in bovine collagen =

Medication

Clinical data
- Trade names: Gintuit
- License data: US DailyMed: Gintuit
- Routes of administration: Topical
- ATC code: None

Legal status
- Legal status: US: ℞-only

Identifiers
- DrugBank: DB10771

Allogeneic cultured keratinocytes and fibroblasts in bovine collagen, sold under the brand name Gintuit, is a cellular therapy used for the treatment of mucogingival (the oral mucosa and gingival (gum) tissues of the mouth) conditions.

Common adverse reactions observed during clinical trials include sinusitis (sinus inflammation), nasopharyngitis (inflammation of the upper throat, upper respiratory tract infection, aphthous stomatitis (canker sores), and local surgery site reactions such as pain and redness.

Allogeneic cultured keratinocytes and fibroblasts in bovine collagen is a cellular sheet that consists of two layers, an upper layer composed of living human keratinocytes (the primary cell type in the skin's outer layer) and a lower layer constructed of bovine-derived collagen, human extracellular matrix proteins (molecules that support and give structure to cells), and living human dermal fibroblasts (skin cells that generate connective tissues). It is the first cell-based product made from allogeneic (cells derived from a donor source that is unrelated to the intended recipient) human cells and bovine collagen approved by the US Food and Drug Administration (FDA). It was approved for medical use in the United States in March 2012.

== Medical uses ==
Allogeneic cultured keratinocytes and fibroblasts in bovine collagen is indicated for topical (non-submerged) application to a surgically created vascular wound bed in the treatment of mucogingival conditions in adults.

== History ==
The efficacy of allogeneic cultured keratinocytes and fibroblasts in bovine collagen (Gintuit) was evaluated in two clinical studies in adults with insufficient gingival tissue. In each of the two studies, Gintuit was associated with an increase of at least 2 mm of gingival tissue in at least 50% of the study subjects. The overall clinical trial safety data for Gintuit included 121 subjects from both studies.
