= Melanosis coli =

- Other names: Pseudomelanosis coli,
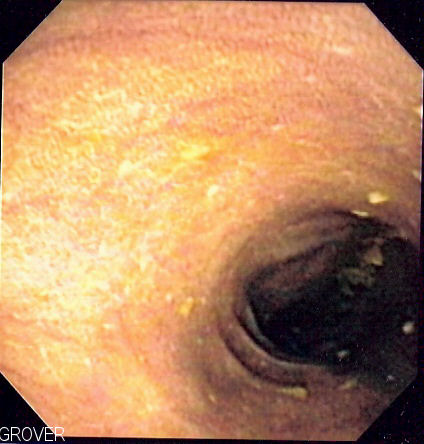
- Melanosis coli identified on colonoscopy as a brownish moiré pattern on the wall of the colon

Micrograph of melanosis coli, with the characteristic mucosal lipofuscin-laden macrophages (brown)

Melanosis coli, also pseudomelanosis coli, is a disorder of pigmentation of the wall of the colon, often identified at the time of colonoscopy. It is benign and may have no significant correlation with disease. The brown pigment is lipofuscin in macrophages, not melanin. It is most commonly associated with the use of certain laxatives.

== Cause ==
The most common cause of melanosis coli is the extended use of laxatives, and commonly anthraquinone containing laxatives such as senna, aloe vera, and other plant glycosides. The anthranoid laxatives pass through the gastrointestinal tract unabsorbed until they reach the large intestine, where they are changed into their active forms. The resulting active compounds cause damage to the cells in the lining of the intestine and leads to apoptosis (a form of cell death). The damaged (apoptotic) cells appear as darkly pigmented bodies that may be taken up by scavenger cells known as macrophages. When enough cells have been damaged, the characteristic pigmentation of the bowel wall develops. The condition can develop after just a few months of laxative use.

However, other causes are identified, including an increase in colonic epithelial apoptosis. Endoscopically, the mucosa may show a brownish discoloration in a moiré pattern.

== Histologic appearance ==
On biopsy, melanosis coli shows characteristic pigment-laden macrophages within the mucosa on PAS staining.

The histologic differential diagnosis of mucosal pigmentation is: lipofuscin (melanosis coli), hemosiderin-laden macrophages, and melanin (rare).

Micrograph showing melanosis coli, which appears as brown pigmentation in the macrophages in the lamina propria

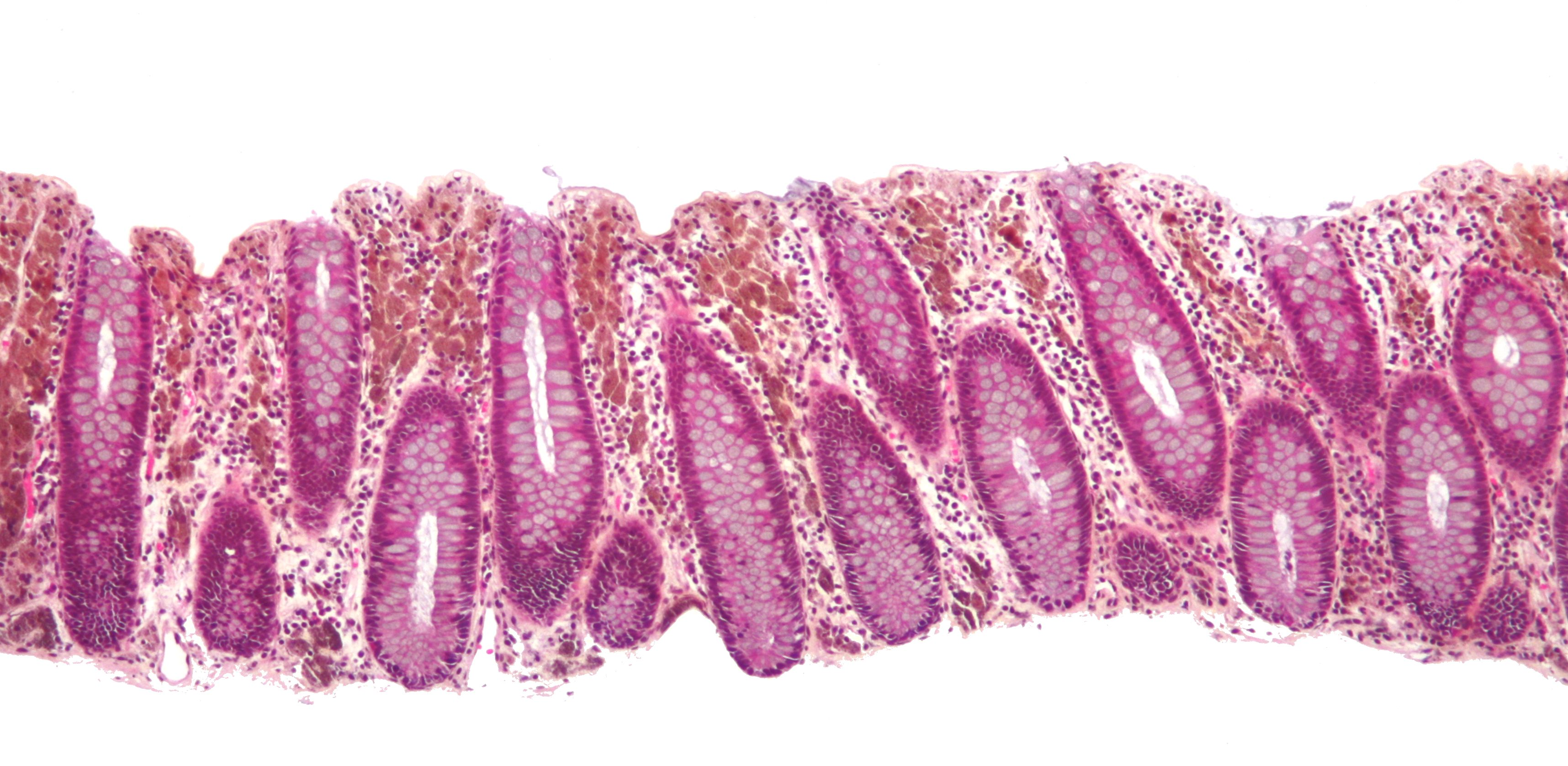
Micrograph of melanosis coli. H&E stain.

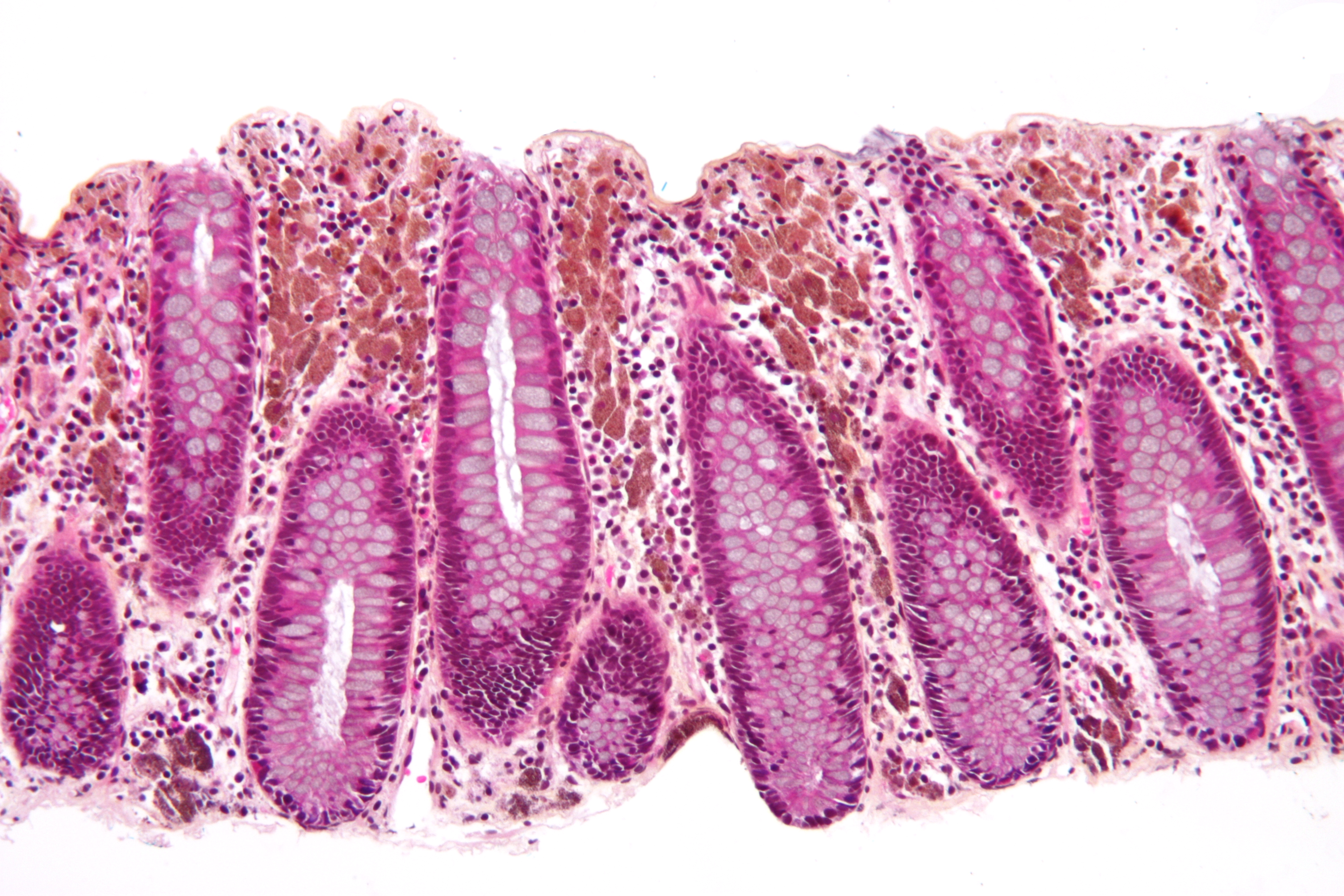
Micrograph of melanosis coli. H&E stain.

== Prognosis ==
No adverse effects or consequences of melanosis coli have been identified.

== Relation to true melanoses ==
The condition is unrelated to true melanoses, such as Peutz–Jeghers syndrome and smoker's melanosis.

Peutz–Jeghers syndrome causes pigmentation of the skin and mucous surfaces with melanin, and polyps in the digestive tract.

== Non-colonic pseudomelanoses ==
Pseudomelanoses of other parts of the gastrointestinal tract have also been reported, and are of unclear relevance.

Patients with colostomies can have melanosis involving the stoma, which is also of no significance.
