= Stomatitis nicotina =

Whitening of the hard palate

- Other names: Nicotine stomatitis, Nicotinic stomatitis, Nicotine palatinus, Stomatitis palatini, Leukokeratosis nicotina palate, Palatal leukokeratosis, Smoker's keratosis, Smoker's palate, and Smoker's patches
- Specialty: Oral medicine

Stomatitis nicotina is a diffuse white patch on the hard palate, usually caused by tobacco smoking, usually pipe or cigar smoking. It is painless, and it is caused by a response of the palatal oral mucosa to chronic heat. A more pronounced appearance can occur with reverse smoking, sometimes distinguished from stomatitis nicotina by the term reverse smoker's stomatitis. While stomatitis nicotina that is caused by heat is not a premalignant condition (i.e. it does not carry an increased risk of transformation to oral cancer), the condition that is caused by reverse smoking is premalignant.

== Signs and symptoms ==
The palate may appear gray or white and contain many papules or nodules that are slightly elevated with red dots in their center. These red dots represent the ducts of minor salivary glands which have become inflamed by heat. The condition is painless. If a denture is normally worn while smoking, then the mucosa underneath the denture appears unaffected by the condition. In severe cases, the mucosa may show fissuring and develop a "dried lake bed" appearance. Other changes associated with tobacco use may be evident such as brown or black extrinsic staining of teeth from tar and other components of tobacco smoke.

== Causes ==
The cause of nicotine stomatitis is thought to be chemical or thermally induced keratosis. The chemicals in tobacco may act as irritants in this condition. Chronic heat exposure is also responsible. Pipe smoking produces more heat on the palate than any other forms of smoking. Long-term drinking of very hot beverages can also cause a similar condition. The severity of the changes correlates with the frequency of the habit. The prevalence depends on a society's use of consuming hot beverages and of smoking in its various forms.

A similar, but more pronounced palatal keratosis occurs with reverse smoking. This is where the lit end of the cigar or cigarette is held in the mouth, another form of smoking associated with high levels of heat in the mouth. This form of the condition is sometimes termed "reverse smoker's keratosis", and is a premalignant lesion. That is, the condition is associated with an increased risk of malignant transformation to oral squamous cell carcinoma (a type of oral cancer). Some sources do not distinguish between reverse smoker's keratosis and smoker's palate that is caused by heat. As such, these sources tend to state that stomatitis nicotina is a premalignant condition. Some reports show that there is an increased risk of tonsillar cancer, lung cancer and tumors of the posterior oral cavity in people who develop stomatitis nicotina.

== Diagnosis ==
The diagnosis is normally made based upon the clinical appearance and history. Tissue biopsy is not usually indicated unless there are areas of ulceration or localized erythroplakia (red patches). The differential diagnosis is with other causes of white lesions (see leukoplakia for a more complete discussion). Specific conditions which can produce a similar appearance include Darier's disease, discoid lupus erythematosus, oral candidiasis, and oral lichen planus.

If a biopsy is taken, the histopathologic appearance is one of hyperkeratosis and acanthosis. There may be squamous metaplasia of excretory ducts, which results in the visible papules if the ducts become hyperplastic. Neutrophils may fill some ducts. It is characterized as a "fissured" or "dried mud" appearance from excess keratin production by cells. Dysplasia is rarely seen.

== Treatment ==
When the appearance is caused by heat, the lesion is usually completely reversible within a few weeks if the smoking habit is stopped. This is the case even if the condition has been present for decades. Without stopping smoking, spontaneous remission of the lesion is unlikely. If the lesion persists despite stopping smoking, this is usually then considered to be a true leukoplakia rather than a reactionary keratitis, and may trigger the decision to carry out a biopsy to confirm the diagnosis. Since this condition almost always develops in the setting of long term heavy smoking, it usually indicates the need for regular observation for cancers associated with smoking, e.g. lung cancer.

== Epidemiology ==
The condition is uncommon. It occurs usually in elderly males who have a history of heavy pipe smoking, but it also can occur in cigar or cigarette smokers. The condition was once common, but has become more rare as habits such as pipe and cigar smoking have decreased in popularity.

== See also ==
- Smoker's melanosis
- Smokeless tobacco keratosis
