= Plasmoacanthoma =

Plasmoacanthoma is a condition of the oral mucosa characterized by a verrucous tumor with a plasma cell infiltrate.

== See also ==
- Plasma cell cheilitis
- Skin lesion
