= Oral florid papillomatosis =

- Specialty: Dermatology

Oral florid papillomatosis is a condition characterized by a white mass resembling a cauliflower covering the tongue and extending onto other portions of the mucous membranes. This is a type of verrucous carcinoma.

== See also ==
- Erythroplakia
- Proliferative verrucous leukoplakia
- List of verrucous carcinoma subtypes
