= Lipofuscin =

Lipid-containing residue associated with aging

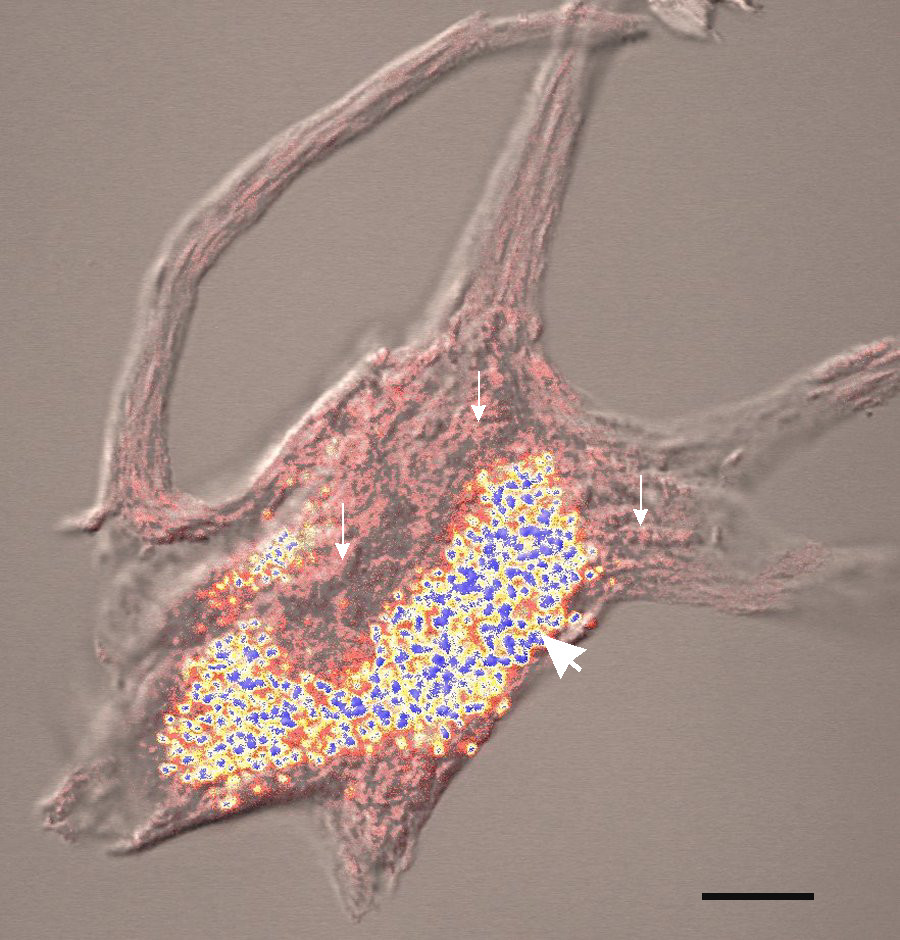
Confocal image of a spinal motor neuron showing stained lipofuscin granules in blue and yellow

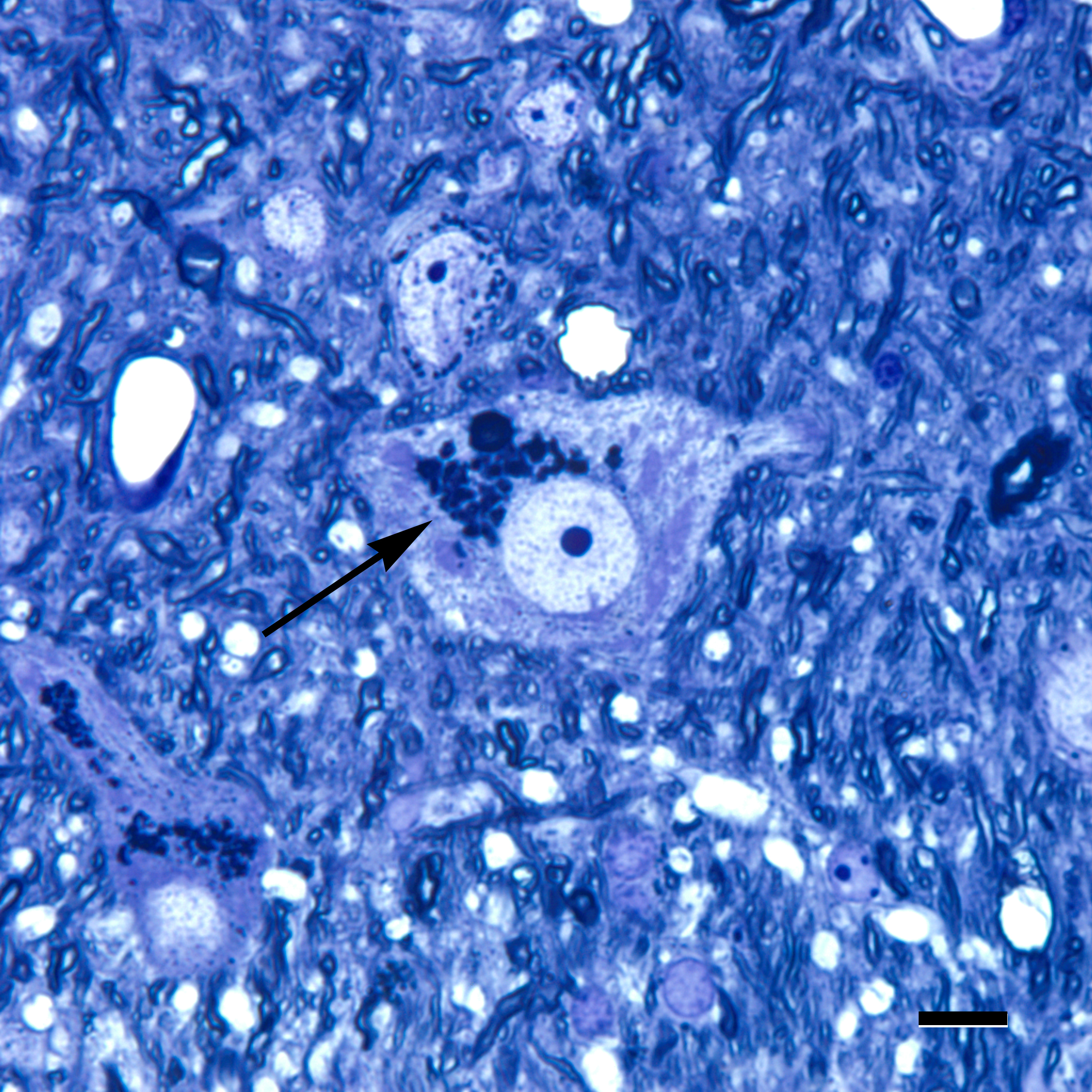
Micrograph showing a cluster of lipofuscin particles (arrow) in a nerve cell of the brain; toluidine blue stain; scale bar = 10 microns (0.01 millimeters)

Lipofuscin is the name given to fine yellow-brown pigment granules composed of lipid-containing residues of lysosomal digestion. It is considered to be one of the aging or "wear-and-tear" pigments, found in the liver, kidney, heart muscle, retina, adrenals, nerve cells, and ganglion cells.

== Formation and turnover ==
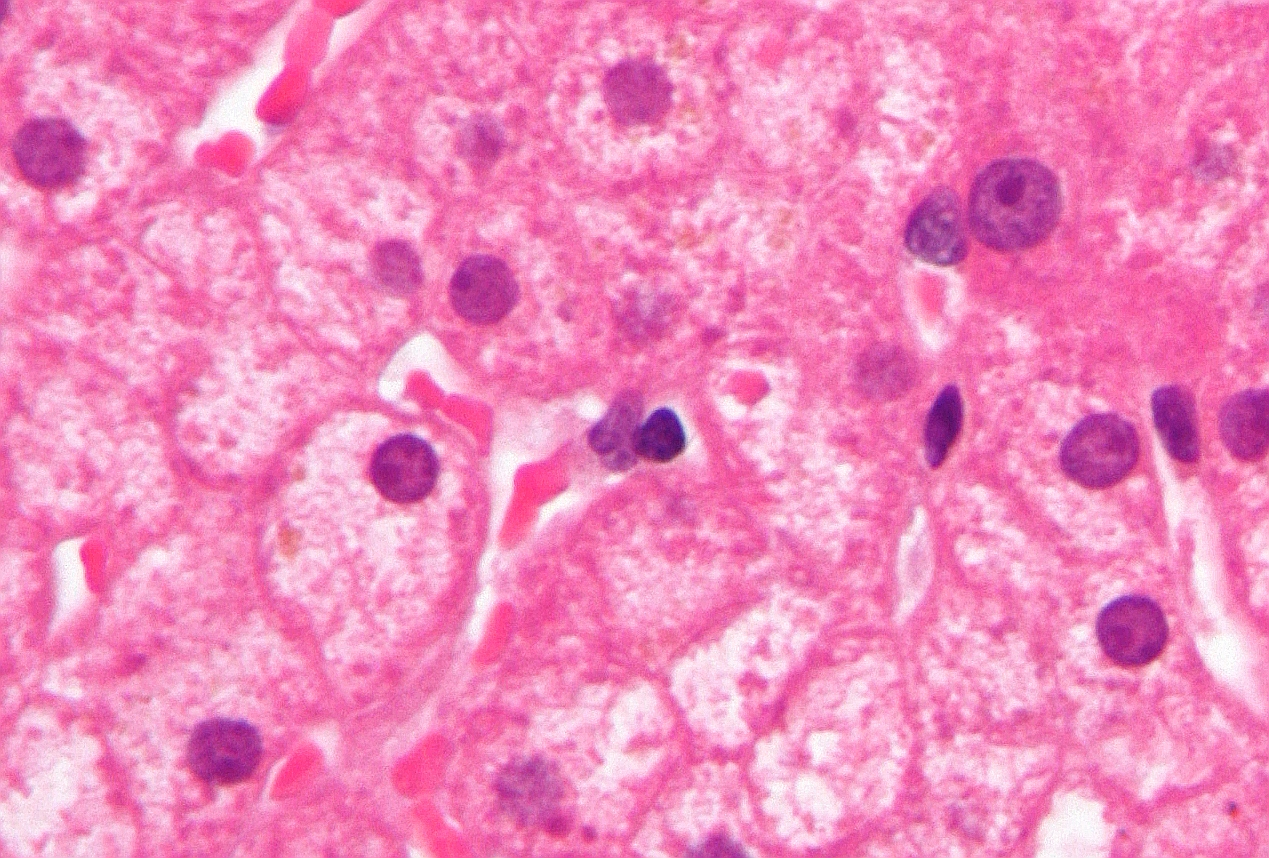
Micrograph showing lipofuscin, in brown/yellow, in a liver biopsy with ground glass hepatocytes; H&E stain

Lipofuscin appears to be the product of the oxidation of unsaturated fatty acids and may be symptomatic of membrane damage, or damage to mitochondria and lysosomes. Aside from a large lipid content, lipofuscin is known to contain sugars and metals, including mercury, aluminium, iron, copper and zinc. Lipofuscin is also accepted as consisting of oxidized proteins (30–70%) as well as lipids (20–50%). It is a type of lipochrome and is specifically arranged around the nucleus.

The accumulation of lipofuscin-like material may be the result of an imbalance between formation and disposal mechanisms. Such accumulation can be induced in rats by administering a protease inhibitor (leupeptin); after a period of three months, the levels of the lipofuscin-like material return to normal, indicating the action of a significant disposal mechanism. However, this result is controversial, as it is questionable if the leupeptin-induced material is true lipofuscin. There exists evidence that "true lipofuscin" is not degradable in vitro; whether this holds in vivo over longer time periods is not clear.

N-retinylidene-N-retinyl-ethanolamine (A2E, a lipofuscin example)

The ABCR -/- knockout mouse has delayed dark adaptation but normal final rod threshold relative to controls. Bleaching the retina with strong light leads to formation of toxic cationic bis-pyridinium salt, N-retinylidene-N-retinyl-ethanolamine (A2E), which causes dry and wet age-related macular degeneration. From this experiment, it was concluded that ABCR has a significant role in preventing formation of A2E in extracellular photoreceptor surfaces during bleach recovery.

== Relation to diseases ==
Micrograph of heart muscle showing lipofuscin pigment, H&E stain

Lipofuscin accumulation in the eye is a major risk factor implicated in macular degeneration, a degenerative disease, and Stargardt disease, an inherited juvenile form of macular degeneration.

In the peripheral nervous system, abnormal accumulation of lipofuscin known as lipofuscinosis is associated with a family of neurodegenerative disorders – neuronal ceroid lipofuscinoses, the most common of these is Batten disease.

Also, pathological accumulation of lipofuscin is implicated in Alzheimer's disease, Parkinson's disease, amyotrophic lateral sclerosis, certain lysosomal diseases, acromegaly, denervation atrophy, lipid myopathy, chronic obstructive pulmonary disease, and centronuclear myopathy. Accumulation of lipofuscin in the colon is the cause of the condition melanosis coli.

On the other hand, myocardial lipofuscin accumulation more directly reflects chronological ageing rather than human cardiac pathology.

== Possible therapies ==
Calorie restriction, vitamin E, and increased glutathione appear to reduce or halt the production of lipofuscin.

The nootropic drug piracetam appears to significantly reduce accumulation of lipofuscin in the brain tissue of rats.

Other possible treatments:

- Centrophenoxine
- Acetyl-L-carnitine
- Ginkgo biloba
- Dimethylethanolamine
- Curcumin

Wet macular degeneration can be treated using selective photothermolysis where a pulsed unfocused laser predominantly heats and kills lipofuscin-rich cells, leaving untouched healthy cells to multiply and fill in the gaps. The technique is also used as a skin treatment to remove tattoos, liverspots, and in general make skin appear younger. This ability to selectively target lipofuscin has opened up research opportunities in the field of anti-aging medicine.

Soraprazan (remofuscin) has been found to remove lipofuscin from retinal pigment epithelial cells in animals. This opens up a new therapy option for the treatment of dry age-related macular degeneration and Stargardt disease, for which there is currently no treatment. The drug has now been granted orphan drug designation for the treatment of Stargardt disease by the European Medicines Agency.

== Other uses ==
Lipofuscin quantification is used for age determination in various crustaceans such as lobsters and spiny lobsters. Since these animals lack bony parts, they cannot be aged in the same way as bony fish, in which annual increments in the ear-bones or otoliths are commonly used. Age determination of fish and shellfish is a fundamental step in generating basic biological data such as growth curves, and is needed for many stock assessment methods. Several studies have indicated that quantifying the amount of lipofuscin present in the eye-stalks of various crustaceans can give an index of their age. This method has not yet been widely applied in fisheries management mainly due to problems in relating lipofuscin levels in wild-caught animals with accumulation curves derived from aquarium-reared animals.

== See also ==
- Residual body
- Advanced glycation end-products (AGEs)

== External links for general reviews ==
- Terman A, Brunk U (2004). "Lipofuscin". Int J Biochem Cell Biol. 36 (8): 1400–4. doi:10.1016/j.biocel.2003.08.009. PMID 15147719.
- Histology at neuro.wustl.edu
- Histology image: 20301loa – Histology Learning System at Boston University
- Destroying Lipofuscin and Destroying Cancer, FightAging.org
- Unfocused Pulsed Lasers Selectively Destroy Lipofuscin, AcceleratingFuture.com
- Lipofuscin
