= Desquamative gingivitis =

- Other names: DG
- Specialty: Periodontology

Desquamative gingivitis is an erythematous (red), desquamatous (shedding) and ulcerated appearance of the gums. It is a descriptive term and can be caused by several different disorders.

== Signs and symptoms ==
Desquamative gingivitis involves lesions of the free and attached gingiva. Unlike plaque-induced inflammation of the gums (normal marginal gingivitis), desquamative gingivitis extends beyond the marginal gingiva, involving the full width of the gingiva and sometimes the alveolar mucosa. The term "full width gingivitis" usually refers to the oral lesions of orofacial granulomatosis however. The color is another dissimilarity between typical marginal gingivitis and desquamative gingivitis, in the latter it is dusky red. Plasma cell gingivitis is another form of gingivitis which affects both the attached and free gingiva.

== Cause ==
Caused by various autoimmune diseases as well as allergies. Erosive lichen planus, mucous membrane pemphigoid, pemphigus vulgaris, erythema exsudativum multiforme and lupus erythematosus.

== Diagnosis ==
=== Differential diagnosis ===
Desquamative gingivitis is a descriptive clinical term, not a diagnosis. Dermatologic conditions cause about 75% of cases of desquamative gingivitis, and over 95% of the dermatologic cases are accounted for by either oral lichen planus or cicatricial pemphigoid. The exact cause of desquamative gingivitis cannot be determined about a third of cases.

- Oral lichen planus
- Cicatricial pemphigoid or less commonly bullous pemphigoid
- Pemphigus vulgaris
- Linear immunoglobulin A disease
- Dermatitis herpetiformis
- Lupus erythematosus
- Chronic ulcerative stomatitis
- Chronic bacterial, fungal, and viral infections
- Reactions to medications, mouthwashes, and chewing gum

Rare causes include:

- Crohn's disease
- Sarcoidosis
- Leukemia
- factitious (self inflicted) lesions
- Squamous cell carcinoma (can be mistaken for desquamative gingivitis)

== Treatment ==
- Improving oral hygiene
- Minimising irritation of the lesions
- Specific therapies for the underlying disease (where available)
- Local or systemic immunosuppressive or dapsone therapy (notably not corticosteroids)

== History ==
This condition was first recognized and reported in 1894, but the term desquamative gingivitis was not coined until 1932.
