= Reverse smoking =

Kind of tobacco smoking

Reverse smoking is a kind of smoking where the burnt end of a hand rolled tobacco leaf is put in the mouth rather than the unlit end of the cigar. It is practiced in some parts of Andhra Pradesh, India, Lusaka, Zambia and the Philippines. While conventional smoking is more prevalent among men, studies suggest that reverse smoking is a more common among women than men. Reverse smoking is considered to be a risk factor for oral cancer.

Reverse smoking may cause a pre-malignant version of Stomatitis nicotina, also called "smoker's palate", characterized by melanin depigmentation and epithelial thinning.
