= Stratified squamous epithelium =

Tissue type

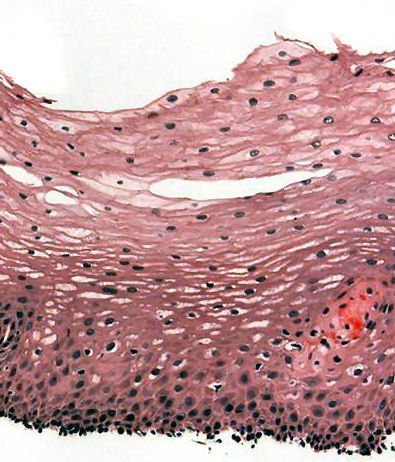
- H&E stain of biopsy of normal esophagus showing the stratified squamous cell epithelium.

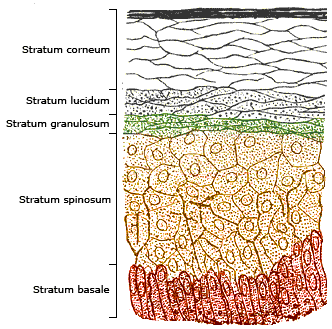
- Section of the human skin showing the stratified squamous epithelial surface, referred to as the epidermis. The layer of keratin here is named the stratum corneum.

Details
- Shape: Many layers of flat cells

Identifiers
- TH: H2.00.02.0.02025, H2.00.02.0.02030
- FMA: 45563

A stratified squamous epithelium consists of squamous (flattened) epithelial cells arranged in layers upon a basal membrane. Only one layer is in contact with the basement membrane; the other layers adhere to one another to maintain structural integrity. Although this epithelium is referred to as squamous, many cells within the layers may not be flattened; this is due to the convention of naming epithelia according to the cell type at the surface. In the deeper layers, the cells may be columnar or cuboidal. There are no intercellular spaces. This type of epithelium is well suited to areas in the body subject to constant abrasion, as the thickest layers can be sequentially sloughed off and replaced before the basement membrane is exposed. It forms the outermost layer of the skin and the inner lining of the mouth, esophagus and vagina.

In the epidermis of skin in mammals, reptiles, and birds, the layer of keratin in the outer layer of the stratified squamous epithelial surface is named the stratum corneum. Stratum corneum is made up of squamous cells which are keratinized and dead. These are shed periodically.

== Structure ==
=== Non-keratinized ===
Non-keratinized surfaces must be kept moist by bodily secretions to prevent them from drying out.

Examples of non-keratinized stratified squamous epithelium include some parts of the lining of oral cavity, pharynx, conjunctiva of eye, esophagus, rectum, vulva, and vagina.

Even non-keratinized surfaces, consisting as they do of keratinocytes, have a minor superficial keratinized layer of varying thickness, depending on the age of the epithelium and the damage it has experienced.

=== Keratinized ===
Keratinized surfaces are protected from absorption by keratin protein. Keratinized epithelium has keratin deposited on the surface which makes it impermeable and dry. Examples of keratinized stratified squamous epithelium include skin, the epidermis of the palm of the hand, and the sole of the foot, and the masticatory mucosa.

== Gallery ==
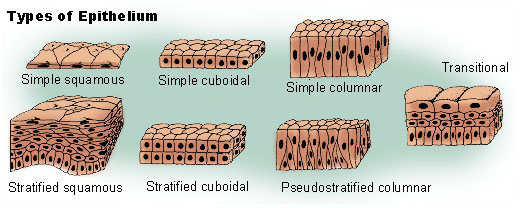
Epithelium

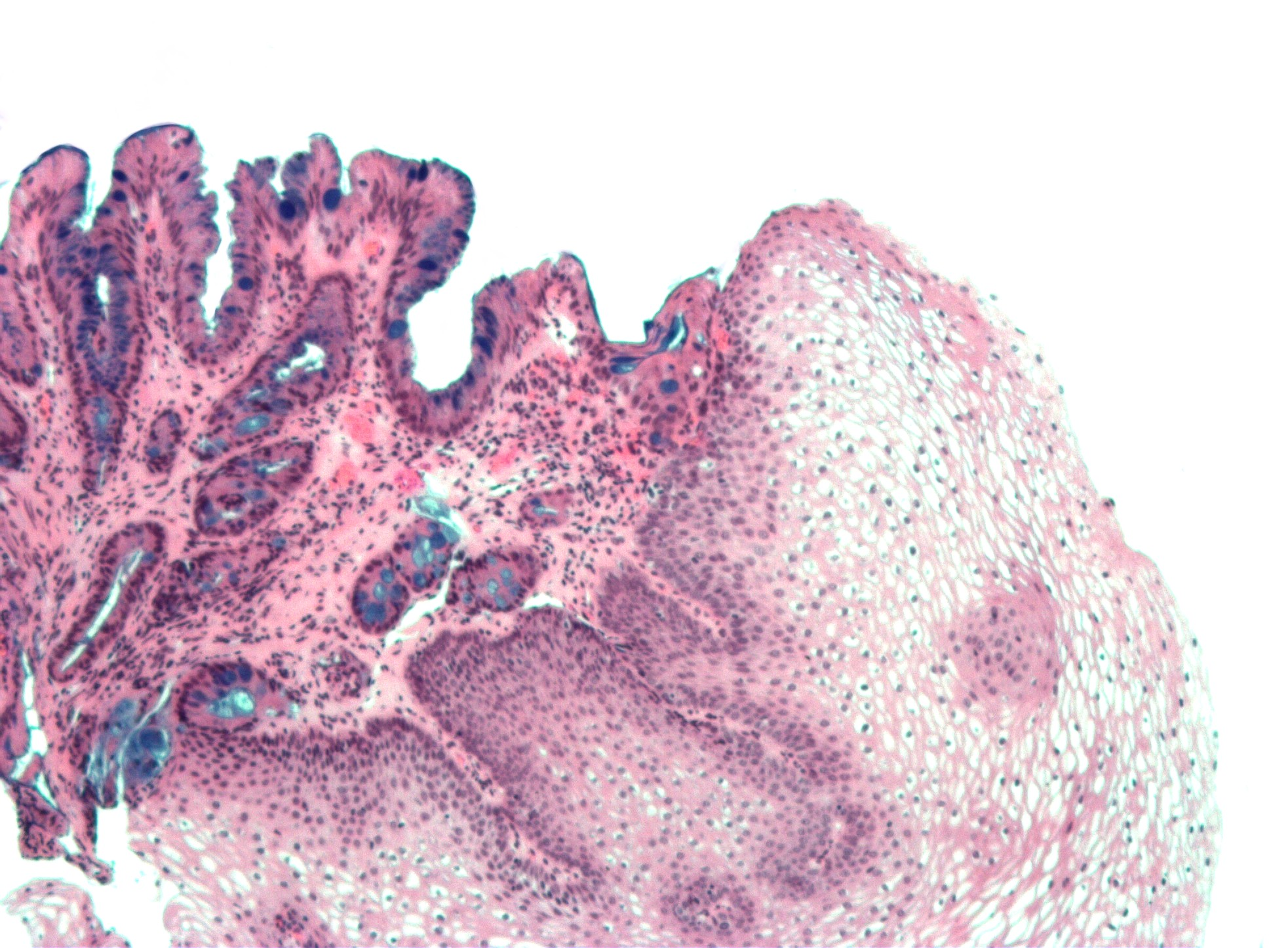
[Micrograph] of normal stratified squamous epithelium and the metaplasic epithelium of Barrett's esophagus (left of image). Alcian blue stain.

Non-keratinized stratified squamous epithelium, image highlights the epithelial nucleuses, rest of the epithelial layer, underlying connective tissue and other epithelia
