= Verrucous carcinoma =

- Specialty: Oncology

Verrucous carcinoma (VC) is an uncommon variant of squamous cell carcinoma. This form of cancer is often seen in those who chew tobacco or use snuff orally, so much so that it is sometimes referred to as "Snuff dipper's cancer".

== Signs and symptoms ==
- Age – usually over 60 years old
- Sex – males are more prone
- Site – gingiva, buccal mucosa, alveolar mucosa, hard palate, floor of the mouth, larynx, oesophagus, penis, vagina, scrotum, foot.
- Clinical presentation:
  - It is a slow growing, diffuse, exophytic lesion usually covered by leukoplakic patches.
  - Invasive lesions quickly invade bones.
  - It can rapidly become fixed with underlying periosteum and cause gradual destruction of jaw bone.
  - Enlarged regional lymph nodes.
  - Lesion shows painful multiple rugae-like folds and deep clefts between them.
  - Regional lymph nodes tender and enlarged.
  - Pain and difficulty in mastication.

== Cause ==
This form of cancer is often seen in those who chew tobacco or use snuff orally, so much so that it is sometimes referred to as "Snuff dipper's cancer". Chewing betel nuts is an additional risk factor commonly seen in Taiwan.

== Risk factors ==
The major risk factors are cigarette smoking and alcohol consumption, while betel nut is an additional factor in Taiwan. Different gene mutation sites in head and neck cancer between western countries and Taiwan have been reported.

The presentation of VC originated from exposure to different carcinogens may not be the same.

== Locations ==
Verrucous carcinoma may occur in various head and neck locations, as well as in the genitalia or sole of the foot. The oral cavity is the most common site of this tumor. The ages range from 50 to 80 years with a male predominance and a median age of 67 years. VC may grow large in size, resulting in the destruction of adjacent tissue, such as bone and cartilage.

== Diagnosis ==
Surgeons must provide adequate specimens including the full thickness of the tumors and adjacent uninvolved mucosa for correct histopathology diagnosis.

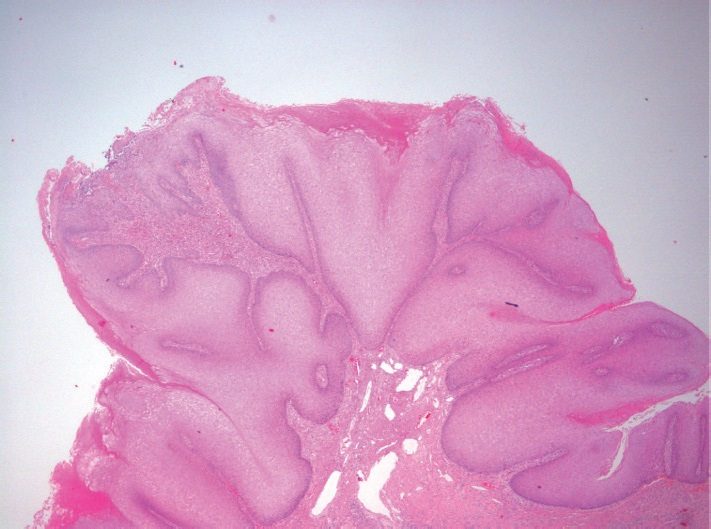
Low-magnification micrograph of penile verrucous carcinoma. The tumor is characterized by prominent papillomatosis.

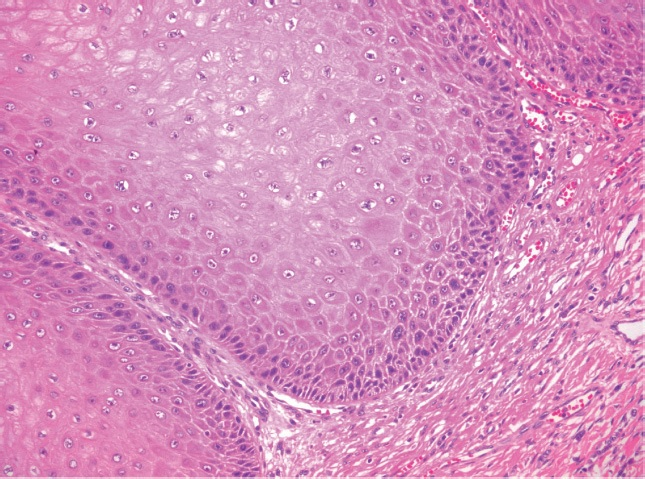
High magnification. There is prominent acanthosis. The tumor front is broad-based and pushes the subepithelial tissues.

=== Subtypes ===
Epithelioma cuniculatum (also known as Carcinoma cuniculatum, and Ackerman tumor) is a subtype of verrucous carcinoma, characterized by well-differentiated epithelial cells which lack cytological atypia, but display a blunt papillary/pebbly surface and keratin-filled crypts extending deep into the connective tissue. These keratin-filled crypts resemble rabbit burrows. It is located almost exclusively on the foot, but at least 50 oral locations have also been observed.

== Treatment ==
Surgery is considered the treatment of choice, but the extent of surgical margin and the adjuvant radiotherapy are still controversial.

Surgical excision alone is effective for controlling VC, but elective neck dissection is not necessary even in patients in the advanced stages.

== Prognosis ==
Most patients with verrucous carcinoma have a good prognosis. Local recurrence is not uncommon, but metastasis to distant parts of the body is rare. Patients with oral verrucous carcinoma may be at greater risk of a second oral squamous cell carcinoma, for which the prognosis is worse.

== See also ==
- List of cutaneous conditions
- List of verrucous carcinoma subtypes
