= Oral mucosa =

Mouth-lining mucous membrane

Details

Identifiers
- Latin: tunica mucosa oris
- MeSH: D009061
- TA98: A05.1.01.002
- TA2: 2785
- FMA: 59660

The oral mucosa is the mucous membrane lining the inside of the mouth. It comprises stratified squamous epithelium, termed "oral epithelium", and an underlying connective tissue termed lamina propria. The oral cavity has sometimes been described as a mirror that reflects the health of the individual. Changes indicative of disease are seen as alterations in the oral mucosa lining the mouth, which can reveal systemic conditions, such as diabetes or vitamin deficiency, or the local effects of chronic tobacco or alcohol use. The oral mucosa tends to heal faster and with less scar formation compared to the skin. The underlying mechanism remains unknown, but research suggests that extracellular vesicles might be involved.

== Classification ==
Oral mucosa can be divided into three main categories based on function and histology:

- Lining mucosa, nonkeratinized stratified squamous epithelium, found almost everywhere else in the oral cavity, including the:
  - Alveolar mucosa, the lining between the buccal and labial mucosae. It is a brighter red, smooth, and shiny with many blood vessels, and is not connected to underlying tissue by rete pegs.
  - Buccal mucosa, the inside lining of the cheeks; part of the lining mucosa.
  - Labial mucosa, the inside lining of the lips; part of the lining mucosa.
- Masticatory mucosa, keratinized stratified squamous epithelium, found on the dorsum of the tongue, hard palate, and attached gingiva.
- Specialized mucosa, specifically in the regions of the taste buds on lingual papillae on the dorsal surface of the tongue; contains nerve endings for general sensory reception and taste perception.

== Structure ==
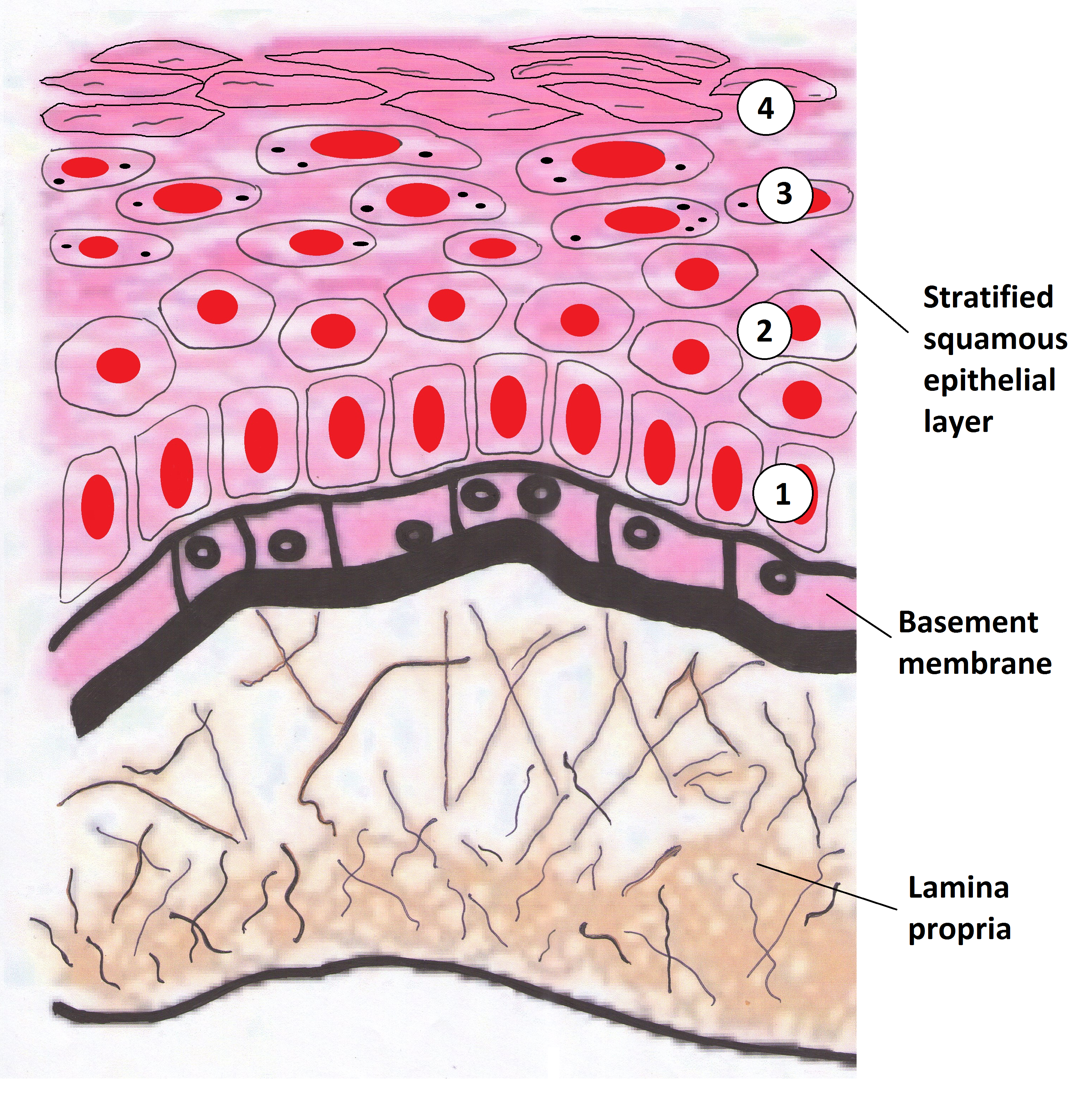
Schematic illustration of the layers found in keratinized oral mucosa that include a deeper lamina propria and basement membrane in-between and superficial layers of strafied squamous epithelium that include from deepest to most superficial: 1: Stratum basale 2: Stratum spinosum 3: Stratum granulosum 4: Stratum corneum

Oral mucosa consists of two layers, the surface stratified squamous epithelium and the deeper lamina propria. In keratinized oral mucosa, the epithelium consists of four layers:

- Stratum basale (basal layer)
- Stratum spinosum (prickle layer)
- Stratum granulosum (granular layer)
- Stratum corneum (keratinized layer)

In nonkeratinised epithelium, the two deep layers (basale and spinosum) remain the same but the outer layers are termed the intermediate and superficial layers.

Depending on the region of the mouth, the epithelium may be nonkeratinized or keratinized. Nonkeratinized squamous epithelium covers the soft palate, inner lips, inner cheeks, the floor of the mouth, and ventral surface of the tongue. Keratinized squamous epithelium is present in the gingiva and hard palate as well as areas of the dorsal surface of the tongue.

Keratinization is the differentiation of keratinocytes in the stratum granulosum into nonvital surface cells or squames to form the stratum corneum. The cells terminally differentiate as they migrate to the surface from the stratum basale where the progenitor cells are located to the superficial surface.

Unlike keratinized epithelium, nonkeratinized epithelium normally has no superficial layers showing keratinization. Nonkeratinized epithelium may, however, readily transform into a keratinizing type in response to frictional or chemical trauma, in which case it undergoes hyperkeratinization. This change to hyperkeratinization commonly occurs on the usually nonkeratinized buccal mucosa when the linea alba forms, a white ridge of calloused tissue that extends horizontally at the level where the maxillary and mandibular teeth come together and occlude. Histologically, an excess amount of keratin is noted on the surface of the tissue, and the tissue has all the layers of an orthokeratinized tissue with its granular and keratin layers. In patients who have habits such as clenching or grinding (bruxism) their teeth, a larger area of the buccal mucosa than just the linea alba becomes hyperkeratinized. This larger white, rough, raised lesion needs to be recorded so that changes may be made in the dental treatment plan regarding the patient's parafunctional habits.

Even keratinized tissue can undergo further level of hyperkeratinization; an increase in the amount of keratin is produced as a result of chronic physical trauma to the region. Changes such as hyperkeratinization are reversible if the source of the injury is removed, but it takes time for the keratin to be shed or lost by the tissue. Thus, to check for malignant changes, a baseline biopsy and microscopic study of any whitened tissue may be indicated, especially if in a high-risk cancer category, such with a history of tobacco or alcohol use or are HPV positive. Hyperkeratinized tissue is also associated with the heat from smoking or hot fluids on the hard palate in the form of nicotinic stomatitis.

The lamina propria is a fibrous connective tissue layer that consists of a network of type I and III collagen and elastin fibers in some regions. The main cells of the lamina propria are the fibroblasts, which are responsible for the production of the fibers as well as the extracellular matrix.

The lamina propria, like all forms of connective tissue proper, has two layers: papillary and dense. The papillary layer is the more superficial layer of the lamina propria. It consists of loose connective tissue within the connective tissue papillae, along with blood vessels and nerve tissue. The tissue has an equal amount of fibers, cells, and intercellular substance. The dense layer is the deeper layer of the lamina propria. It consists of dense connective tissue with a large amount of fibers. Between the papillary layer and the deeper layers of the lamina propria is a capillary plexus, which provides nutrition for the all layers of the mucosa and sends capillaries into the connective tissue papillae.

A submucosa may or may not be present deep in the dense layer of the lamina propria, depending on the region of the oral cavity. If present, the submucosa usually contains loose connective tissue and may also contain adipose tissue or salivary glands, as well as overlying bone or muscle within the oral cavity. The oral mucosa has no muscularis mucosae, and clearly identifying the boundary between it and the underlying tissues is difficult. Typically, regions such as the cheeks, lips, and parts of the hard palate contain submucosa (a layer of loose fatty or glandular connective tissue containing the major blood vessels and nerves supplying the mucosa). The submucosa's composition determines the flexibility of the attachment of oral mucosa to the underlying structures. In regions such as the gingiva and parts of the hard palate, oral mucosa is attached directly to the periosteum of underlying bone, with no intervening submucosa. This arrangement is called a mucoperiosteum and provides a firm, inelastic attachment.

A variable number of Fordyce spots or granules are scattered throughout the nonkeratinized tissue. These are a normal variant, visible as small, yellowish bumps on the surface of the mucosa. They correspond to deposits of sebum from misplaced sebaceous glands in the submucosa that are usually associated with hair follicles.

A basal lamina (basement membrane without aid of the microscope) is at the interface between the oral epithelium and lamina propria similar to the epidermis and dermis.

== Function ==
Mechanical stress is continuously placed on the oral environment by actions such as eating, drinking and talking. The mouth is also subject to sudden changes in temperature and pH meaning it must be able to adapt to change quickly. The mouth is the only place in the body which provides the sensation of taste. Due to these unique physiological features, the oral mucosa must fulfil a number of distinct functions.

- Protection: One of the main functions of the oral mucosa is to physically protect the underlying tissues from the mechanical forces, microbes and toxins in the mouth. Keratinised masticatory mucosa is tightly bound to the hard palate and gingivae. It accounts for 25% of all oral mucosa. It supports underlying tissues by resisting the loading forces exerted during mastication. Lining mucosa in the cheeks, lips and floor of mouth is mobile to create space when chewing and talking. During mastication, it allows food to move freely around the mouth and physically protects the underlying tissues from trauma. It accounts for 60% of oral mucosa.
- Secretion: Saliva is the primary secretion of the oral mucosa. It has many functions including lubrication, pH buffering and immunity. The lubricating and antimicrobial functions of saliva are maintained mainly by resting; saliva results in a flushing effect and the clearance of oral debris and noxious agents. Saliva contains numerous antimicrobial proteins that help protect the oral ecosystem from infectious agent. The components like lysozyme, lactoferrin, salivary peroxidase, myeloperoxidase, and thiocyanate concentrations act as a defense mechanism in the saliva. Saliva is secreted from 3 pairs of major salivary glands (parotid, submandibular, sublingual) alongside many minor salivary glands. It also aids the initial chemical digestion of food as it contains the enzyme amylase, responsible for breaking carbohydrates into sugars.
- Sensation: The oral mucosa is richly innervated, meaning it is a very good at sensing pain, touch, temperature and taste. A number of cranial nerves are involved in sensations in the mouth including trigeminal (V), facial (VII), glossopharyngeal (IX) and vagus (X) nerves. The dorsum of the tongue is covered in specialised mucosa. This contains the presence of taste buds allowing taste, and it accounts for around 15% of oral mucosa. Reflexes such as swallowing, gagging and thirst are also initiated in the mouth.
- Thermal regulation: Although not significant in humans, some animals such as dogs rely on panting to regulate their temperature, as sweat glands are only present in their paws.

== Clinical significance ==
=== Infective ===
==== Viral ====
The majority of viral infections affecting the oral cavity are caused by the human herpes virus group. Each human herpes virus may present differently within the oral cavity. They are more likely to affect immunocompromised patients such as children and the senior population.

- Herpetic gingivostomatitis: A self-limiting viral infection which is caused by herpes simplex virus-1 (HSV-1). It usually presents in young children and is very contagious. It is characterised by the presence of small oral blisters which break down and coalesce into ulcers.
- Herpes labialis (cold sore): Reactivation of latent herpes simplex virus-1 triggered by sunlight, stress, and hormonal changes. It is characterised by the presence of crusting blisters on the upper lip.
- Chickenpox: A type of viral infection which is caused by varicella zoster virus and presents in children. Numerous itchy blisters are found on the face and body. Blisters could also be found on inner cheek and palate of the mouth.
- Herpes zoster/shingles: Viral infection caused by reactivation of latent varicella zoster virus and found in adults. Patients can present with acute pain before or after the onset of blisters. If viral reactivation occurs in the facial nerve, it can cause Ramsay–Hunt syndrome in which patients can develop facial paralysis, blisters around the ears and on the tongue, and loss of tongue sensation.
- Hand, foot, and mouth disease: A highly contagious viral infection which infects young children and is caused by coxsackie virus A16. It is characterised by presence of small blisters all over the limbs and the mouth.
- Measles: A highly infectious condition which is caused by measles virus. It most commonly presents in young children who have not been vaccinated. It is characterised by presence of white spots (Koplik's spots) which rupture to form ulcers on the palate.
- Papillomas and warts/verrucae: They are caused by various strains of the human papilloma virus (HPV) of which there are more than 100 strains but usually due to HPV types 6 and 11. Papillomas are mostly spiky, finger like projections, or cauliflower head rounded lobular shaped. Usually painless and singular. Verrucae usually appear on the lips. Verrucae vulgaris is associated with HPV types 2 and 4. HPV types 16 and 18, designated high risk due to association with cancers, do not present like this in the oral mucosa but as white patches. Multifocal epithelial hyperplasia (Heck disease) is rare, usually familial, swellings appear in multiples and are more common to some Native American and Inuit groups. Verruciform xanthoma, a rare lesion which may resemble papilloma, is often white due to hyperkeratosis, usually appear in 50-70 year age group, commonly on the gingivae. They may be mistaken for papilloma or verrucous leukoplakia but are benign.

==== Bacterial ====
- Syphilis: Bacterial infection which is usually sexually transmitted. It is caused by bacteria Treponema pallidum and it has different types of oral presentation at different stages of the disease.

==== Fungal ====
Oral fungal infections are most commonly caused by different Candida species, such as Candida albicans, Candida glabrata and Candida tropicalis resulting in oral candidiasis. There are several predisposing factors to fungal infections, such as diabetes and recent use of antibiotics or steroid inhalers. Management includes identifying and addressing contributory factors, the use of topical or systemic antifungal agents, and oral hygiene instruction.

Different presentations of oral candidiasis include:

- Pseudomembranous candidiasis
- Erythematous candidiasis
- Denture stomatitis
- Antibiotic candidiasis
- Angular cheilitis
- Median rhomboid glossitis
- Chronic hyperplastic candidiasis
- Chronic mucocutaneous candidiasis

=== Autoimmune ===
- Lichen planus: A chronic inflammatory disease with different forms of oral presentations. The most classic appearance of lichen planus is the presence of white streaks in inner cheek, tongue, and gum. Desquamative gingivitis can be seen in patients with lichen planus. Biopsy is done for definitive diagnosis of lichen planus.
- Graft-versus-host disease: An autoimmune disease developed following bone marrow transplant in which its oral presentation is similar to lichen planus.
- Pemphigus vulgaris: An autoimmune chronic disease with clinical presentation of formation of superficial and large blisters which then burst into ulcers on the skin or mucous membrane.
- Mucous-membrane pemphigoid: Autoimmune disease which affects only mucous membranes with clinical presentation of hard and rigid blisters which then rupture eventually into deep ulcers.
- Cutaneous lupus erythematosus: These present as oral discoid lesions which may be present on the inner cheek and behind the lips. White papules may also be present.

=== Hypersensitivity reaction ===
- Lichenoid reaction: Intra-oral lesion which shares the appearance of lichen planus but arises due to contact hypersensitivity to certain dental materials or drug-induced.

=== Traumatic ===
- Frictional keratosis: This typically presents as white plaques on the oral mucosa due to mechanical trauma. When the cause of frictional keratosis is removed the white patch may resolve.
- Hyperplastic reactive lesions or nodular swellings: These occur in the oral mucosa due to low grade inflammation or trauma. They develop where the mucosa is subjected to chronic minor irritants, mechanical or infective. They most frequently occur on the buccal mucosa (inner cheek) along the occlusal line where the teeth meet and the gingivae (the mucosa which covers the gums); reactive nodules occurring here are specifically categorised as epulides instead of polyps. Also the alveolar ridge (the gum where the teeth erupt up from, or if missing, where they used to be) and the hard palate (roof of the mouth). The most common are fibrous nodules called fibroepithelial polyps and epulides. Other hyperplastic reactive hyperplastic lesions include those associated with dentures, and papillomas. However, they are all similar in cause and nature, the overproduction of the cells of the mucosa, primarily the epithelial cells, also fibrous myxoid and low inflamed tissue due to irritation. Fibroepithelial polyps are usually pale, firm to touch, and painless but further irritation can cause abrasion and then ulceration or bleeding. They are sometimes be called fibroma, such as leaf fibroma, a fibroepithelial polyp often occurring under a denture and appears flattened. However, they are not true benign neoplasms (denoted by suffix ~oma), which are similar in appearance but very rare in the mouth. Fibrous epulis are fibroepithelial polyps located only on the gingivae. Pyogenic granuloma and pregnancy epulis are both vascular rather than fibrous epulides with more dilated blood vessels making them appear darker pink or red in colour, and soft. They may develop more fibrous as they mature. The pregnancy variant only appears in pregnancy, usually due to plaque and should resolve with better oral hygiene and at the end of the pregnancy if not. Pyogenic granuloma may occur elsewhere in the mouth such as the tongue and lips, but are not therefore epulides. Giant cell epulis, also known as peripheral giant cell granuloma, are like fibrous epulis and occur at the anterior interdental margin, the gum between the teeth at the front. They are more common in females. They are often soft round and deep red to purplish blue. It is important they are investigated to make are they are not true giant cell granuloma. Papilliary hyperplasia of the palate, or epulis fissaratum/denture-induced hyperplasia. The cause may be unknown, but there is an association with ill-fitting dentures resulting in irritation to the mucosa, usually by overextended flange, and with poor denture or oral hygiene. Oral thrush can be present but is not thought to be the cause.

=== Idiopathic ===
- Recurrent apthous stomatitis (RAS): Recurrent ulceration found in the mouth with a wide variety of predisposing factors. However, the aetiology remains unclear. There are three forms of RAS: minor, major, and herpetiform. RAS is usually found in non-smokers and those from high socioeconomic background.

=== Neoplastic ===
- Oral submucous fibrosis: This is a condition that involves inflammation of the tissues under the surface. This may cause rigid tissues and difficulty opening the mouth.

==== Benign soft tissue neoplasms ====
- Peripheral nerve sheath tumours: These most commonly are traumatic neuromas, a reactive response to trauma, neurilemmoma and neurofibroma which are large growing painless tumours usually found on the tongue. Neurofibroma may occur as a benign solitary lesion but can present as multiple lesions associated with (Von Reckllinghausen's Disease) neurofibromatosis. They can be preceded by café au lait pigmentation spots on the skin, and as they grow can become very disfiguring. Malignant change can occur in neurofibromatosis but very rarely in single lesion presentation. Mucosal neuromas can be associated with other conditions such as multiple endocrine neoplasia (MEN) syndrome and may precede thyroid cancer.
- Lipoma and fibrolipoma: These are tumours of adipose tissue, or fat, giving them a yellow appearance which varies according to fat content. They are usually soft, mobile, slow growing painless and occur mostly in middle age or the elderly.
- Granular cell tumour: These are also tumours arising from neural cells, though it was incorrectly thought to arise from muscle cells and therefore previously called granular cell myoblastoma. It also is slow growing large painless and occurs mostly in the tongue.
- Congenital epulis: These are also known as congenital granular cell tumours (but not related to granular cell tumours), and occur mostly on the upper gum, the maxillary alveolar ridge, of newborns, predominantly females. Rarely, they occur elsewhere, usually the tongue. They are usually self-resolving.
- Angiomas: These are vascular tumours, including haemangioma, lymphangioma, venus varix. Angiomas are difficult to classify as previously they were considered hamartomas, benign tumour-like malformations but there is debate if they are developmental abnormality, true benign tumour or hamartoma, or can be either. Haemangiomas are common in the oral mucosa but can occur in other structures such as salivary glands, and can be congenital or develop in childhood. Congenital lesions can resolve spontaneously (involute) but those that develop later usually continue to slowly grow. They are usually dark red-purple or blue, soft, sometimes fluctuant and painless. They commonly blanch on pressure. Usually solitary, they can occur as part of syndromes such as Sturge–Weber syndrome affecting the trigeminal nerve. They are at risk of trauma with subsequent excessive bleeding, thrombosis or calcification. Lymphangiomas are far less common in the oral mucosa, usually appearing on the tongue, less commonly the lip at birth or in infancy. They are colourless to pale pink and may be nodular projections or resemble "frog spawn" domes. They can cause macroglossia (enlargement of the tongue). Venous varix, like varicose vein, usually appear in older people on the lower lip as a blue-purple lump.

==== Sarcomas ====
Connective tissue malignancies, sarcomas, are rare in the oral mucosa. Osteosarcoma, chondrosarcoma arise in bone and cartilage, lymphoma in haematological disorders. The most common malignancies are carcinomas, overwhelmingly squamous cell carcinoma.

- Rhabdomyosarcoma: These are fast growing destructive swellings usually in the maxilla. It is the most common oral sarcoma in children and adolescents, but rare.
- Kaposi sarcoma: These are related to the Kaposi sarcoma herpes virus (KSHV) or human herpes virus (HHV-8) viral infection. Predominating on the hard palate and gingivae it develops initially as a macule ranging in colour from red, blue, purple to brown or black, becoming nodular as it grows. The lesions are highly vascular and can ulcerate and bleed easily; death is usually from opportunistic infections. It is usually associated with HIV/AIDS but also less commonly with immunosuppression such as organ donor recipients or prevalent in some communities such as Mediterranean Jews. There is no cure but the lesions respond well to highly active antiretroviral treatment (HAART) drugs.

== Routes of administration ==
- Buccal Mucosa (inner cheek): Suitable for buccal administration.
- Labial Mucosa (inner lips): Suitable for buccal drug administration.
- Sublingual Mucosa (under tongue): Ideal for sublingual administration due to high permeability.
- Sublabial Mucosa (under lower lip): Suitable for sublabial administration due to good vascularization.

== See also ==
- Oral mucosa tissue engineering
- Junctional epithelium
- Oral cancer
- Salivary glands
- Basal lamina
- Fibroblast
