= Outline of smoking =

Overview of and topical guide to smoking

The following outline is provided as an overview of and topical guide to smoking:

Smoking – activity of intentionally burning and inhaling a small quantity of a substance, most often tobacco.

== Description ==
Smoking can be described as all of the following:

- Preventable cause of death
- Recreational drug use

== Types of smoking ==
- Tobacco smoking – method of consuming tobacco, from which small amounts are burned and the smoke inhaled.
- Cannabis smoking – method of consuming cannabis, from which small amounts are burned and the smoke inhaled.

== History of smoking ==
History of smoking

== General smoking concepts ==
- Cigarette
- Cigarette taxes in the United States
- Tobacco and health
- History of commercial tobacco in the United States
- Inflight smoking
- Religious views on smoking
- Smoking pipe
- Smoking ban
- Smoking cessation
- Smoking fetish
- Vaporizer
- Herbal cigarette

== See also ==
- Smoke
