= Smoking =

Inhaling burnt substance for psychoactive effects

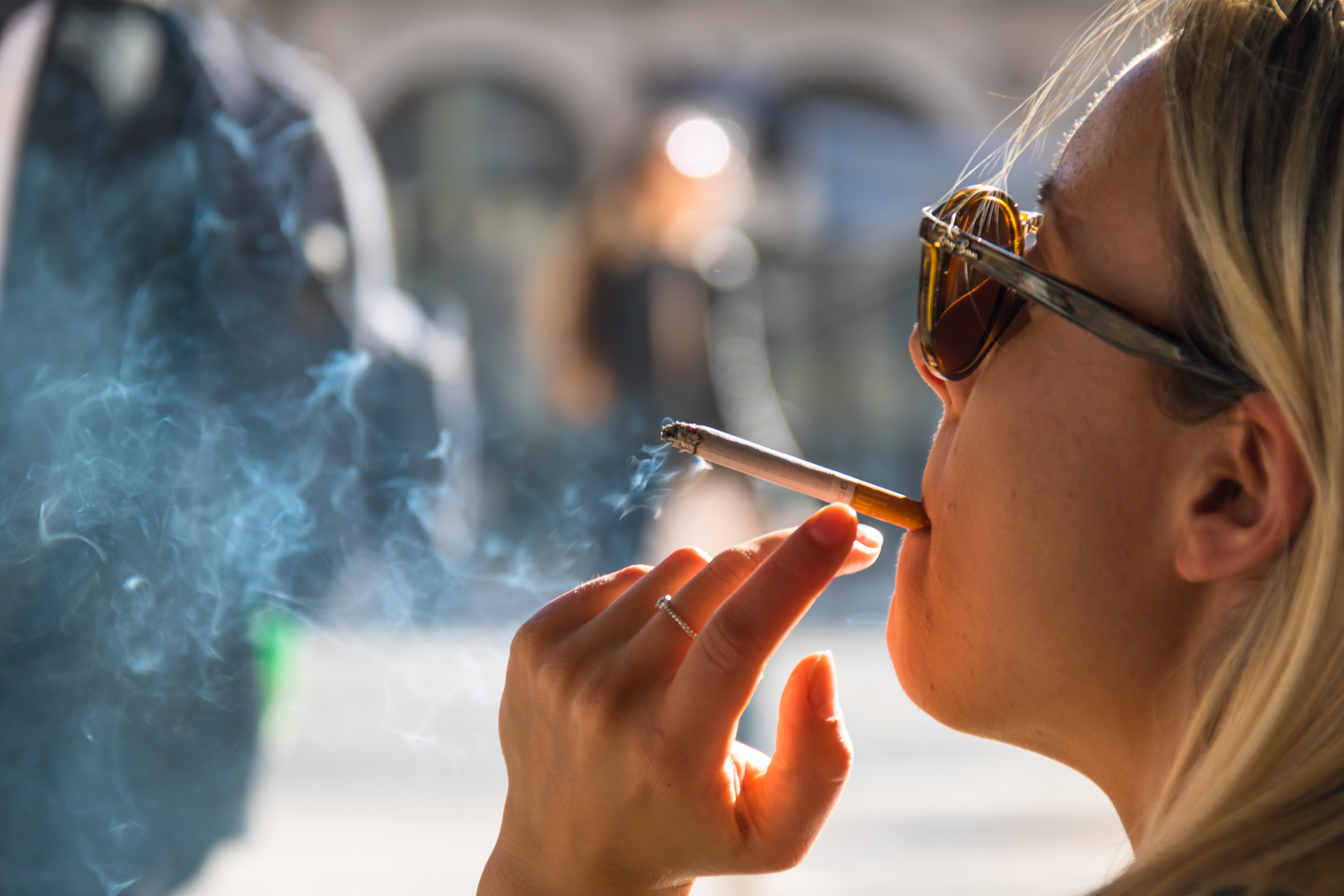
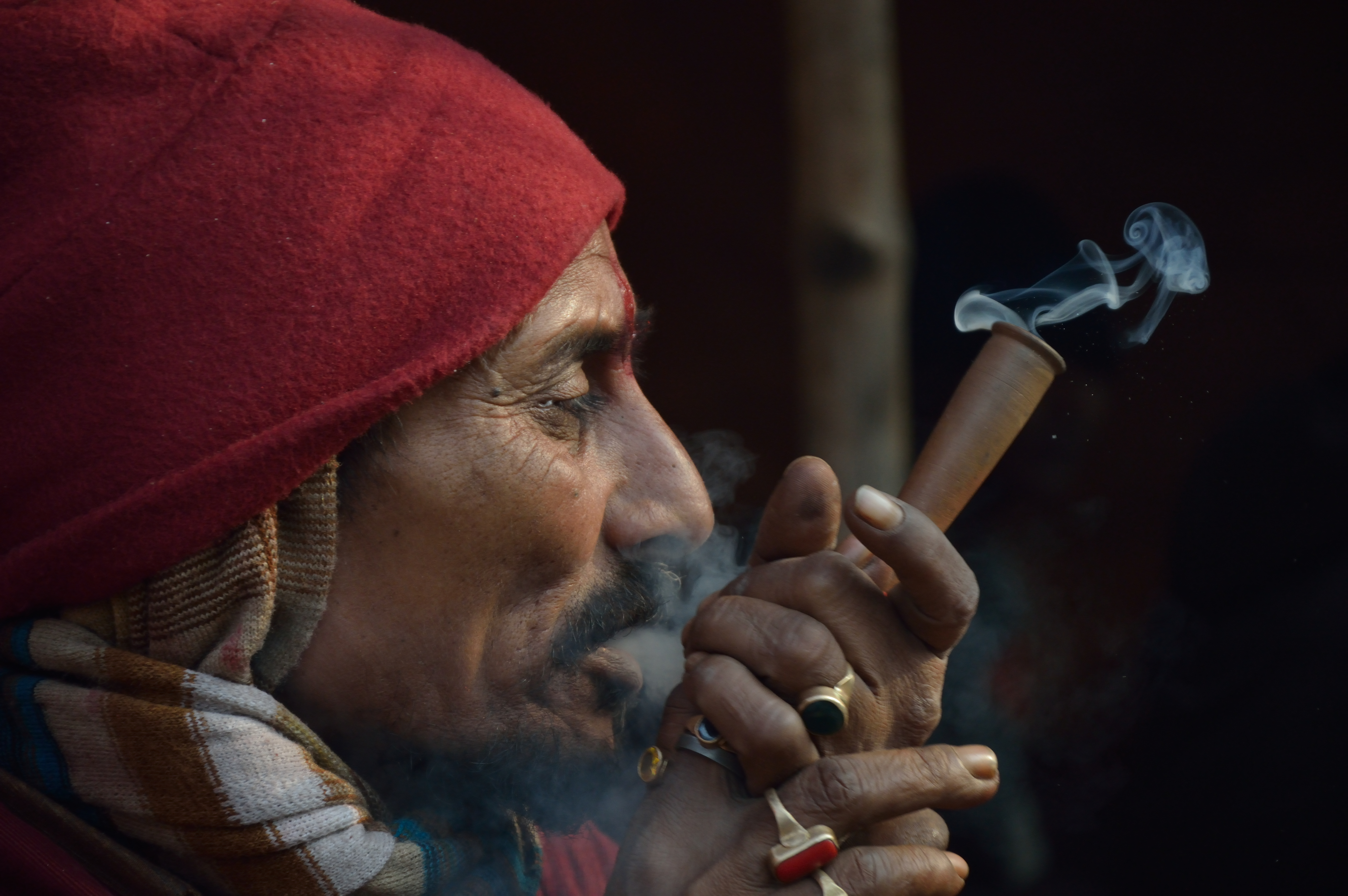
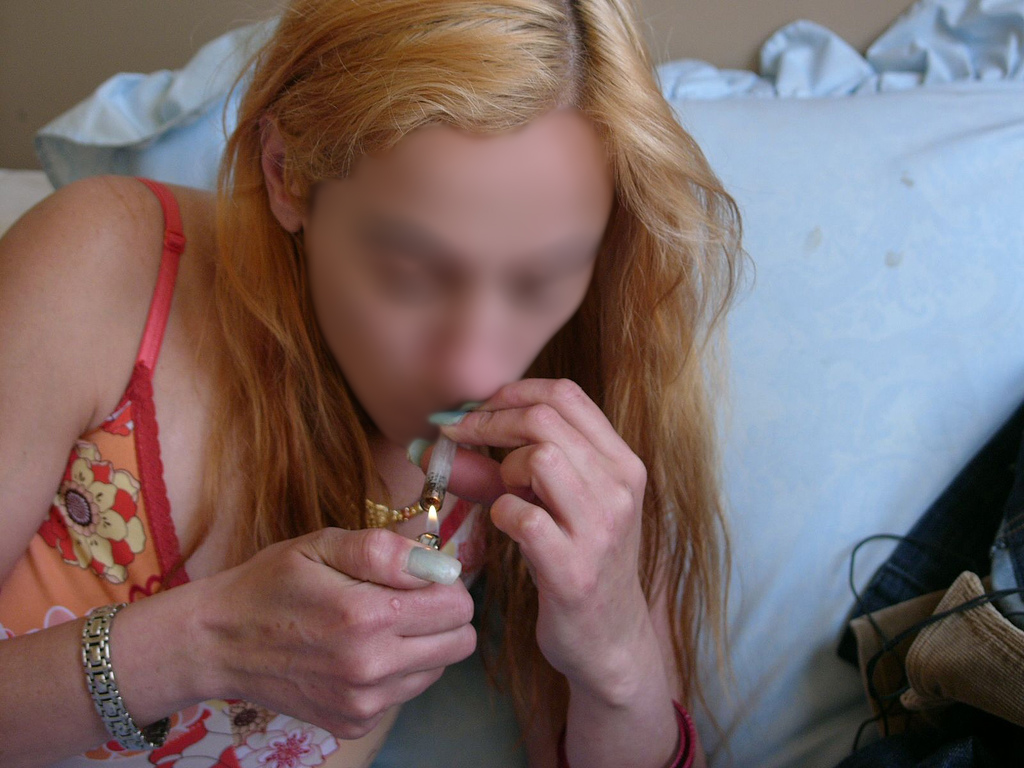
Clockwise from top left: A woman smoking a cigarette in Portugal, a man smoking cannabis in India, a woman smoking crack cocaine through a glass pipe

Smoking is the combustion of a substance, usually plant material, and the inhalation of resulting fumes. Today, smoking is mostly practiced by rolling the dried leaves of the tobacco plant into a cigarette. Other forms of tobacco smoking include the use of smoking tobacco with a pipe or cigar, or using a bong. Cigarette smokers almost always inhale the smoke; most pipe and cigar smokers do not inhale.

Smoking is primarily practiced as a route of administration for psychoactive chemicals because the active substances within the burnt, dried plant leaves (or other chemical) can vaporize into a gaseous state and be delivered into the respiratory tract, where they are rapidly absorbed into the bloodstream through the lungs and can reach the central nervous system. In the case of tobacco smoking, these active substances are a mixture of aerosol particles that include the pharmacologically active alkaloid nicotine, which stimulates the nicotinic acetylcholine receptors in the brain, and other non-psychoactive chemicals that result from combustion. Other notable drugs inhaled via smoking include tetrahydrocannabinol (from cannabis), morphine (from opium), cocaine (from crack), and methamphetamine. Designer drugs, or "research chemicals", can also be smoked.

Tobacco smoking is the most popular form, being practiced by over one billion people globally, of whom the majority are in the developing countries. Less common drugs for smoking include cannabis and opium. Some of the substances are classified as hard narcotics, like heroin, but the use of these is very limited as they are usually not commercially available. Cigarettes are primarily industrially manufactured but also can be hand-rolled from loose tobacco and rolling paper. Other smoking implements include pipes, cigars, bidis, hookahs, and bongs.

Smoking tobacco harms health, and is among the leading causes of many diseases such as lung cancer, heart attack, chronic obstructive pulmonary disease, erectile dysfunction, and birth defects. Diseases related to tobacco smoking have been shown to kill approximately half of long-term smokers when compared to average mortality rates faced by non-smokers. Smoking is estimated to kill more than seven million people worldwide each year, including 1.6 million non-smokers who die due to passive smoking. A 2023 analysis put global tobacco-attributable deaths at just over seven million for that year. The health risks of smoking have caused many countries to tax tobacco products heavily, publish anti-smoking advertisements, limit or ban tobacco advertising, and help smokers to quit.

Smoking can be dated as early as 5000 BCE and has been recorded in many different cultures across the world. Early smoking evolved in association with religious ceremonies as offerings to deities, in cleansing rituals, or to allow shamans and priests to alter their minds for purposes of divination or spiritual enlightenment. After the European exploration and conquest of the Americas, the practice of smoking tobacco quickly spread to the rest of the world. In regions like India and Sub-Saharan Africa, it merged with existing practices of smoking (mostly of cannabis). In Europe, it introduced a new type of social activity and a form of drug intake which previously had been unknown.

Perception surrounding smoking has varied over time and from one place to another: holy and sinful, sophisticated and vulgar, a panacea and deadly health hazard. By the late 20th century, smoking came to be viewed in a decidedly negative light, especially in Western countries.

== Health effects ==
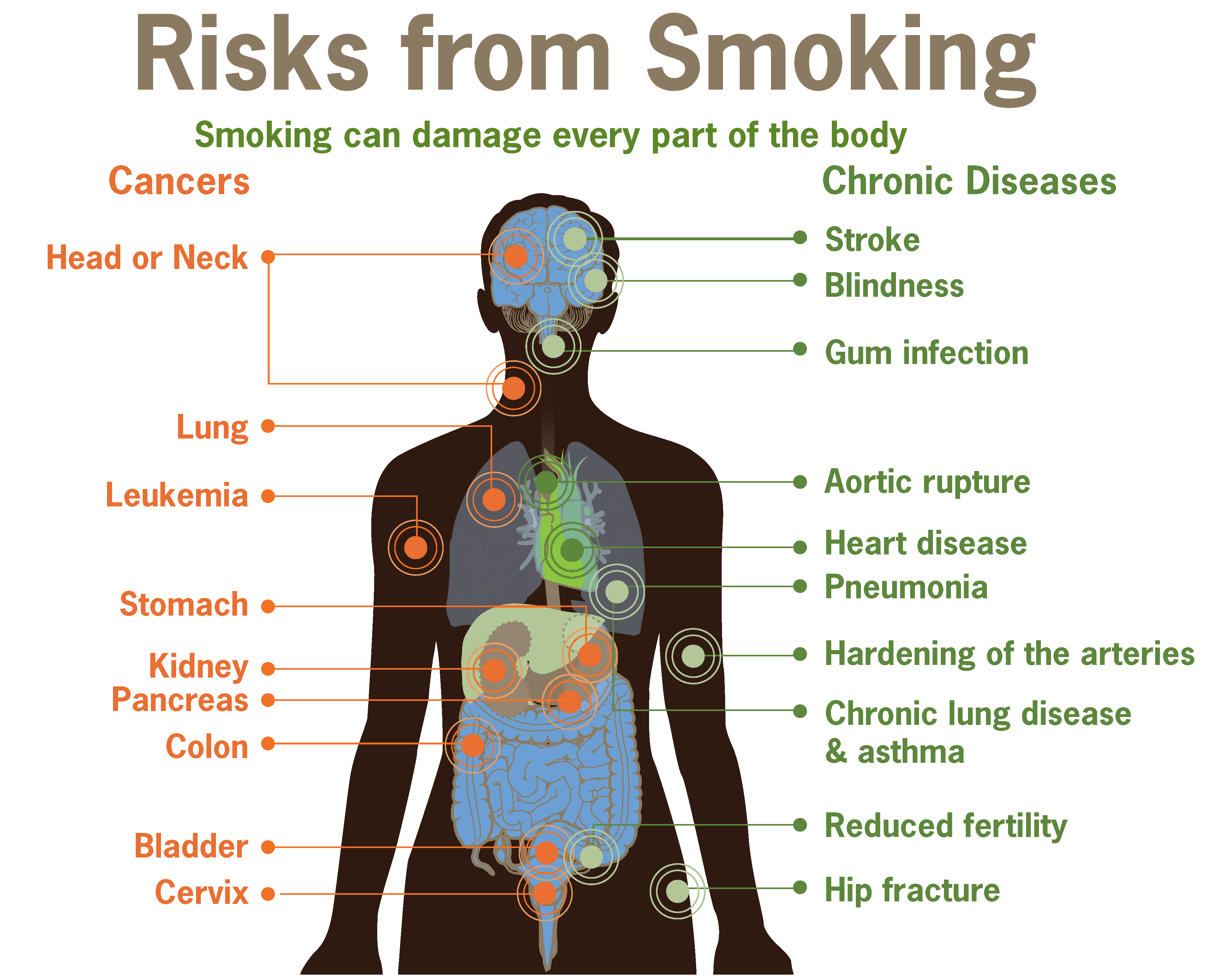
A diagram of the human body showing some of the diseases caused by smoking (diagram created by the Centers for Disease Control and Prevention).

Death rate from smoking

Share deaths smoking

Smoking is one of the leading preventable causes of death globally and is the cause of over 7 million deaths annually, 1.6 million of which are non-smokers who die due to passive smoking. In the United States alone, about 480,000 individuals die annually due to smoking and a 2004 study estimated that as much as one-third of China's male population will have significantly shortened lifespans due to smoking. Male and female smokers lose an average of 13.2 and 14.5 years of life, respectively.

Currently, the number of premature deaths in the US from tobacco use per year exceeds the number of employees in the tobacco industry by 4 to 1. It has been estimated that tobacco smoking will kill about 1 billion people in the 21st century if current smoking patterns continue, half of them before the age of 70.

At least half of all lifelong smokers die earlier as a result of smoking. The risk of dying from lung cancer before age 85 is 22.1% for a male smoker and 11.9% for a female current smoker, in the absence of competing causes of death. The corresponding estimates for lifelong nonsmokers are a 1.1% probability of dying from lung cancer before age 85 for a man of European descent, and a 0.8% probability for a woman. Smoking just one cigarette a day results in a risk of coronary heart disease that is halfway between that of a heavy smoker and a non-smoker. The non-linear dose–response relationship may be explained by smoking's effect on platelet aggregation.

Among the diseases that can be caused by smoking are vascular stenosis, lung cancer, heart attacks and chronic obstructive pulmonary disease (COPD). Prenatal exposure to tobacco smoke is associated with a higher risk of attention deficit hyperactivity disorder (ADHD) in children, though it remains unclear whether the relationship is causal or reflects shared genetic and familial factors between parent and child.

Smoking is a risk factor strongly associated with periodontitis and tooth loss. The effects of smoking on periodontal tissues depend on the number of cigarettes smoked daily and the duration of the habit. A study showed that smokers and former smokers had 2.7 times and 2.3 times greater probabilities to have established periodontal disease than non‐smokers, respectively, independent of age, sex, and plaque index; however, the effect of tobacco on periodontal tissues seems to be more pronounced in men than in women. Studies have found that smokers had greater odds for more severe dental bone loss compared to non‐smokers. Also, people who smoke and drink alcohol heavily have much higher risk of developing oral cancer (mouth and lip) compared with people who do neither. Smoking can also cause melanosis in the mouth.

Smoking has been also associated with oral conditions including dental caries, dental implant failures, premalignant lesions, and cancer. Smoking can affect the immune-inflammatory processes which may increase susceptibility to infections; it can alter the oral mycobiota and facilitate colonization of the oral cavity with fungi and pathogenic molds.

Many governments are trying to deter people from smoking with anti-smoking campaigns in mass media stressing the harmful long-term effects of smoking. Passive smoking, the inhalation of tobacco smoke by people in the immediate vicinity of smokers, is a major reason for the enforcement of smoking bans. These are laws enforced to stop individuals from smoking in indoor public places, such as bars, pubs, and restaurants, thus reducing nonsmokers' exposure to passive smoke. A common concern among legislators is to discourage smoking among minors, with some countries increasing the age a person must be to buy cigarettes. In 110 countries, cigarette packaging display graphic health warnings. Tobacco advertising is also sometimes regulated and/or banned to make smoking less appealing.

Despite the many bans, European countries still hold 18 of the top 20 spots and, according to the ERC Research Group, the heaviest smokers are from Greece, averaging 3,000 cigarettes per person in 2007. Rates of smoking have leveled off or declined in the developed world but continue to rise in developing countries. Smoking rates in the United States have dropped by half from 1965 to 2006, falling from 42% to 20.8% in adults.

The relationship between smoking and Alzheimer's disease risk is disputed. A 2010 analysis found smoking increased Alzheimer's risk once studies funded by the tobacco industry (which had tended to report a protective effect) were excluded, while a later pooled analysis of longitudinal cohorts across several countries found no significant association between smoking and dementia, including Alzheimer's disease specifically. While smoking more than 15 cigarettes per day has been shown to worsen the symptoms of Crohn's disease, smoking has been shown to actually lower the prevalence of ulcerative colitis.

Smokers are 30–40% more likely to develop type 2 diabetes than non-smokers, and the risk increases with the number of cigarettes smoked.

In 2021, the WHO reported the leading cause of tobacco-attributable deaths in the European Region was bronchus and lung cancer at 63.5%.

=== Physiology ===
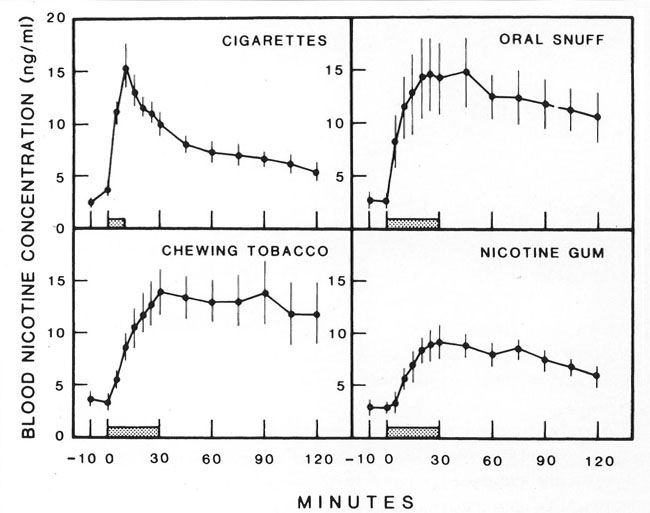
A graph that shows the efficiency of smoking as a way to absorb nicotine compared to other forms of intake

The most genotoxic cancer causing chemicals in cigarette smoke
Compound	Micrograms per cigarette	Effect on DNA	Ref.
Acrolein	122.4	Reacts with deoxyguanine and forms DNA crosslinks, DNA-protein crosslinks and DNA adducts	
Formaldehyde	60.5	DNA-protein crosslinks causing chromosome deletions and re-arrangements	
Acrylonitrile	29.3	Oxidative stress causing increased 8-oxo-2'-deoxyguanosine	
1,3-butadiene	105.0	Global loss of DNA methylation (an epigenetic effect) as well as DNA adducts	
Acetaldehyde	1448.0	Reacts with deoxyguanine to form DNA adducts	
Ethylene oxide	7.0	Hydroxyethyl DNA adducts with adenine and guanine	
Isoprene	952.0	Single and double strand breaks in DNA	

Inhaling the vaporized gas form of substances into the lungs is a quick and very effective way of delivering drugs into the bloodstream (as the gas diffuses directly into the pulmonary vein, then into the heart and from there to the brain) and affects the user within less than a second of the first inhalation. The lungs consist of several hundred million tiny air sacs called alveoli (an average of about 480 million in an adult lung) that together provide a very large surface area for gas exchange, often compared to the size of a tennis court. This can be used to administer useful medical as well as recreational drugs such as aerosols, consisting of tiny droplets of a medication, or as gas produced by burning plant material with a psychoactive substance or pure forms of the substance itself. Not all drugs can be smoked, for example the sulphate derivative that is most commonly inhaled through the nose, though purer free base forms of substances can, but often require considerable skill in administering the drug properly. The method is also somewhat inefficient since not all of the smoke will be inhaled. The inhaled substances trigger chemical reactions in nerve endings in the brain due to being similar to naturally occurring substances such as endorphins and dopamine, which are associated with sensations of pleasure. The result is what is usually referred to as a "high" that ranges between the mild stimulus caused by nicotine to the intense euphoria caused by heroin, cocaine and methamphetamines.

Inhaling smoke into the lungs, no matter the substance, has adverse effects on one's health. The incomplete combustion produced by burning plant material, like tobacco or cannabis, produces carbon monoxide, which impairs the ability of blood to carry oxygen when inhaled into the lungs. There are several other toxic compounds in tobacco that constitute serious health hazards to long-term smokers from a whole range of causes; vascular abnormalities such as stenosis, lung cancer, heart attacks, strokes, impotence, low birth weight of infants born to smoking mothers. Long-term smokers develop the characteristic set of facial changes known as smoker's face in about 8% of cases.

The distinction between nicotine and tobacco smoke is central to discussions of smoking-related diseases. While Nicotine is the main addictive substance in tobacco smoke, many major smoking-related diseases are associated with toxicants produced by combustion, including carbon monoxide and carcinogenic compounds in smoke. This has contributed to the development and public-health discussion of non-combustible nicotine and tobacco products, such as electronic cigarettes, heated tobacco products, and smokeless tobacco, which are being promoted as possible alternatives for adults who would otherwise continue to smoke.

Tobacco smoke is a complex mixture of over 7,000 identified chemicals, of which 250 are known to be harmful, at least 69 cause cancer, and 98 are known to have specific toxicological properties. The most important chemicals causing cancer are those that produce DNA damage since such damage appears to be the primary underlying cause of cancer. Cunningham et al. combined the microgram weight of the compound in the smoke of one cigarette with the known genotoxic effect per microgram to identify the most carcinogenic compounds in cigarette smoke. The seven most important carcinogens in tobacco smoke are shown in the table, along with DNA alterations they cause.

Smoking tobacco in any form is harmful to health in many ways, in particular associated with lung cancer. A study of the risk of cancers of the lung, upper aerodigestive tract, and bladder found that pipe smokers had 2.2 times higher risk than non-smokers, cigar smokers had 3.0 times the risk, and cigarette smokers had 5.3 times the risk. Effects for each mode of smoking were stronger in current than former smokers, and in inhalers than in non-inhalers.

=== Psychology ===
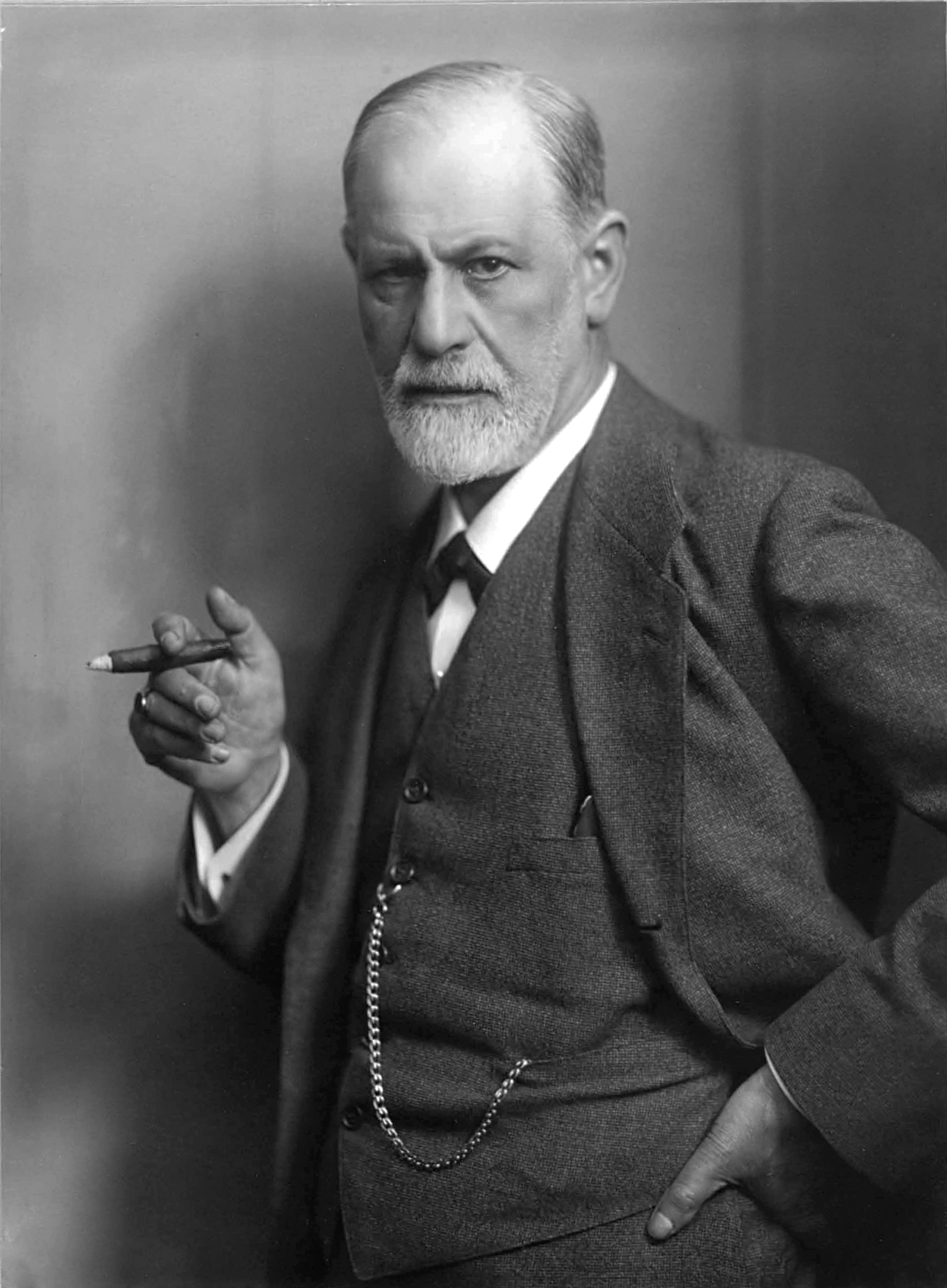
Sigmund Freud, whose doctor assisted with his suicide because of oral cancer caused by smoking

Most tobacco smokers begin during adolescence or early adulthood. Smoking has elements of risk-taking and rebellion, which often appeal to young people. The presence of high-status models and peers may also encourage smoking. Because teenagers are influenced more by their peers than by adults, attempts by parents, schools, and health professionals at preventing people from trying cigarettes are not always successful.

Smokers often report that cigarettes help relieve feelings of stress. However, the stress levels of adult smokers are slightly higher than those of nonsmokers. Adolescent smokers report increasing levels of stress as they develop regular patterns of smoking, and smoking cessation leads to reduced stress. Far from acting as an aid for mood control, nicotine dependency seems to exacerbate stress. This is confirmed in the daily mood patterns described by smokers, with normal moods during smoking and worsening moods between cigarettes. Thus, the apparent relaxant effect of smoking only reflects the reversal of the tension and irritability that develop during nicotine depletion. Dependent smokers need nicotine to remain feeling normal.

In the mid-20th century psychologists such as Hans Eysenck developed a personality profile for the typical smoker of that period; extraversion was associated with smoking, and smokers tended to be sociable, impulsive, risk taking, and excitement-seeking individuals.

In terms of the Big Five personality traits, research has found smoking to be correlated with lower levels of agreeableness and conscientiousness, as well as higher levels of extraversion and neuroticism.

== Prevalence ==
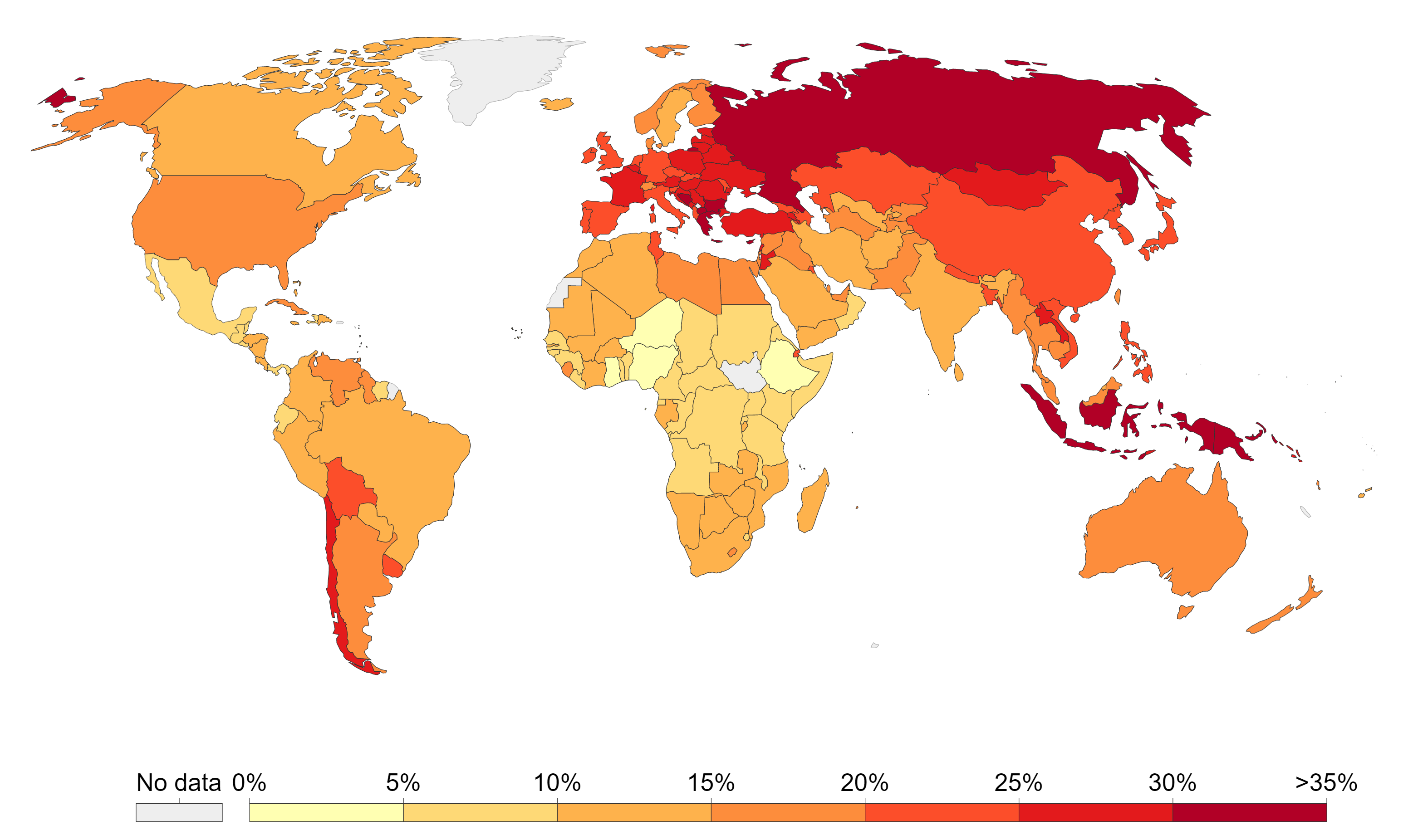
Percentage of adults who smoked daily in 2012

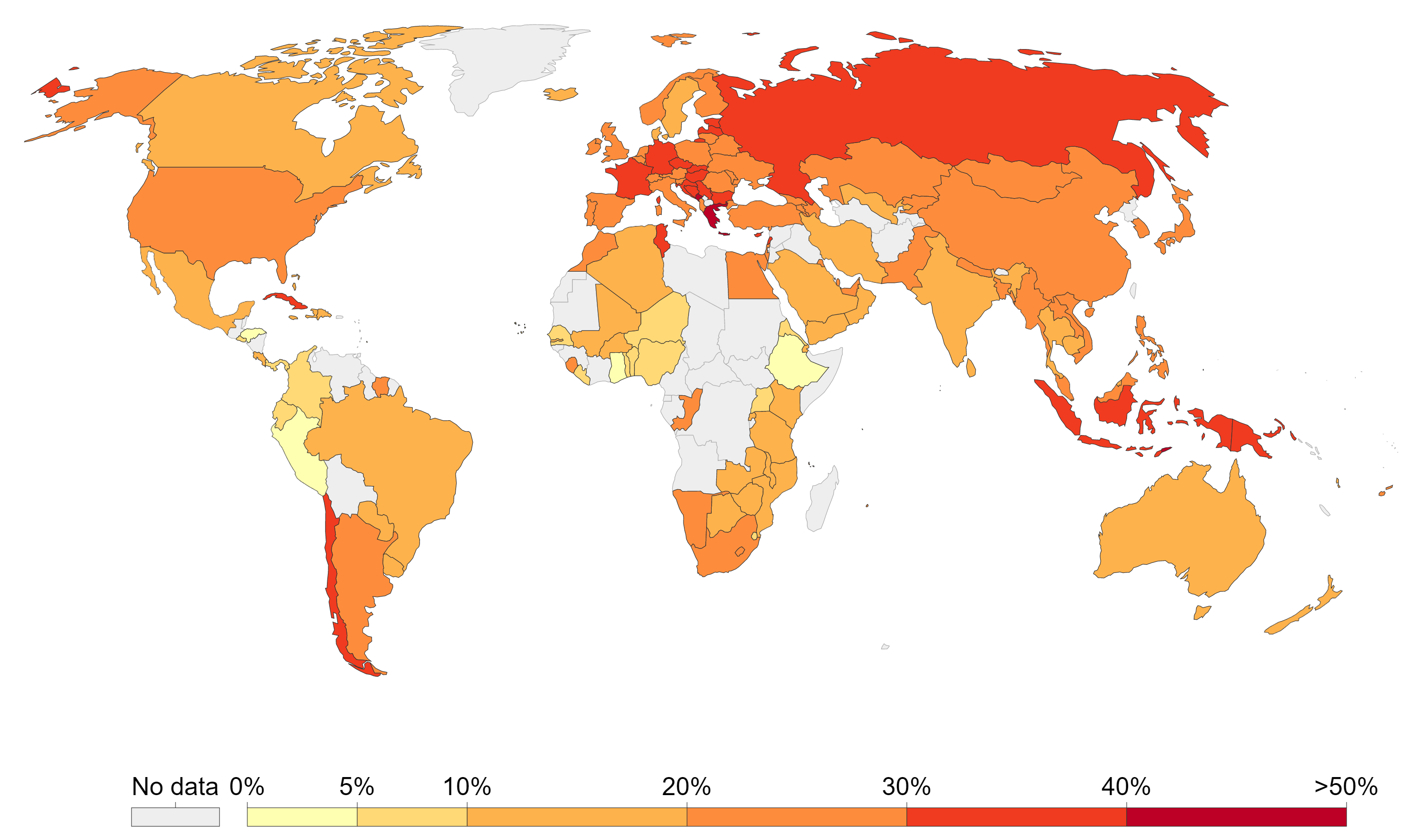
Percentage of adults who smoked daily or non-daily in 2016

Smoking is declining. In 2000, 32.7% of the global population smoked. By the year 2020, this percentage had decreased to 22.7% of the global population. In 2024, the WHO reported that the number of tobacco users had fallen from 1.38 billion in 2000 to approximately 1.2 billion. Smoking is more prevalent in males, with 36.7% of males over the age of 15 smoking, compared to 7.8% of females aged 15 or over. The rate of smoking amongst young people aged 15–24 years has declined from 20.8% in 2000 to 14.2% in 2020. The fastest decline in smoking is in the Americas region, South Asia and Africa are seeing average smoking cessation trends and Europe is seeing slower rates of declines in smoking.

Though tobacco may be consumed by either smoking or other smokeless methods such as chewing, the World Health Organization (WHO) only collects data on smoked tobacco. Smoking has been studied more extensively than other forms of tobacco consumption.

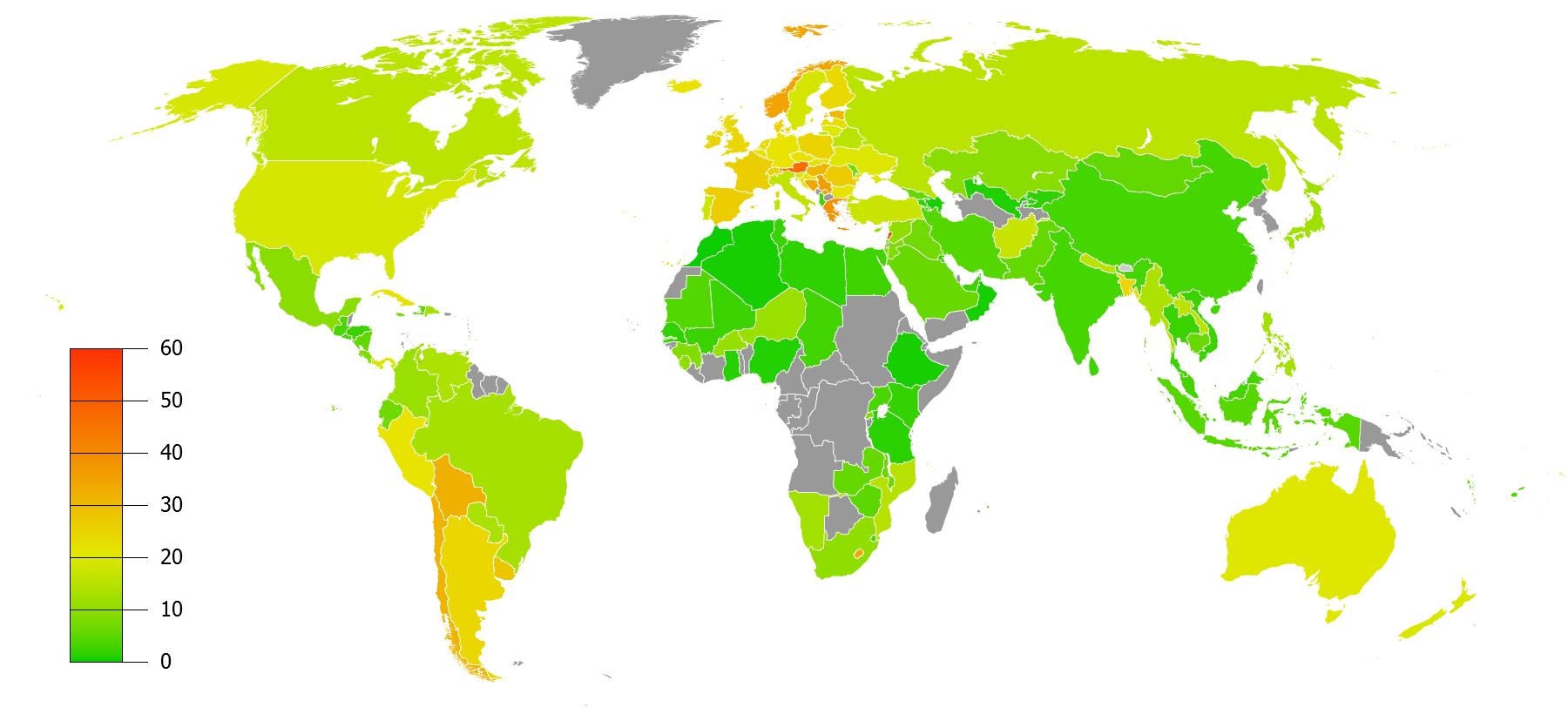
Percentage of females smoking any tobacco product in 2008

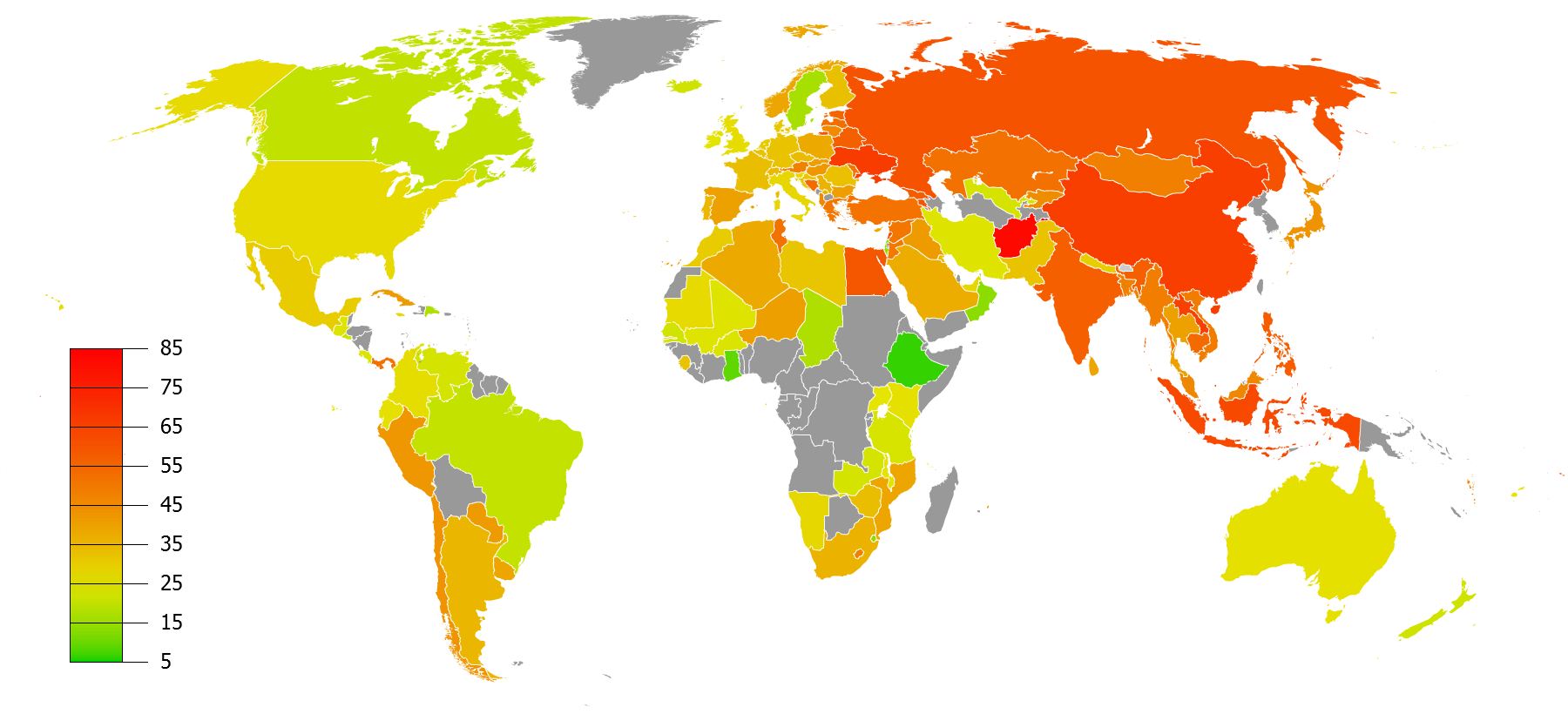
Percentage of males smoking any tobacco product in 2008. Note that there is a difference between the scales used for females and for males.

In 2000, smoking was practiced by 1.22 billion people, predicted to rise to 1.45 billion people in 2010 and 1.5 to 1.9 billion by 2025. If prevalence had decreased by 2% a year since 2000 this figure would have been 1.3 billion in 2010 and 2025. Despite dropping by 0.4 percent from 2009 to 2010, the United States still reports an average of 17.9 percent usage.

The WHO states that "[m]uch of the disease burden and premature mortality attributable to tobacco use disproportionately affect the poor". Of the 1.22 billion smokers, 1 billion live in developing or transitional nations. Rates of smoking have leveled off or declined in the developed world. In the developing world, however, smoking rates were rising by 3.4% per year as of 2002.

The WHO in 2004 projected 59 million deaths to occur globally, from which 5.4 million are smoking-attributed, and 4.9 million as of 2007. As of 2002, 70% of the deaths are in developing countries.

Presently, approximately 8 million individuals succumb to tobacco-related diseases annually, resulting in a significant economic burden of $1.4 trillion on the global scale each year.

China has the largest tobacco smoking population, followed by India. India has the highest tobacco chewing population in the world. 154 people die every hour in India because of chewing and smoking tobacco.

Many government regulations have been passed to protect citizens from harm caused by public environmental tobacco smoke. In the United States, the "Pro-Children's Act of 2001" prohibits smoking within any facility that provides health care, day care, library services, or elementary and secondary education to children. On May 23, 2011, New York City enforced a smoking ban for all parks, beaches, and pedestrian malls in an attempt to eliminate threats posed to civilians by environmental tobacco smoke.

=== Adolescent smoking ===
The shift in prevalence of tobacco smoking to a younger demographic, mainly in the developing world, can be attributed to several factors. The tobacco industry spends up to $13 billion annually on advertising, which is increasingly geared towards adolescents in the developing world because they are a vulnerable audience for the marketing campaigns. Adolescents have more difficulty understanding the long-term health risks that are associated with smoking and are also more easily influenced by "images of romance, success, sophistication, popularity, and adventure which advertising suggests they could achieve through the consumption of cigarettes". This shift in marketing towards adolescents and even children in the tobacco industry is debilitating to organizations' and countries' efforts to improve child health and mortality in the developing world. It reverses or halts the effects of the work that has been done to improve health care in these countries, and although smoking is deemed as a "voluntary" health risk, the marketing of tobacco towards very impressionable adolescents in the developing world makes it less of a voluntary action and more of an inevitable shift.

As of 2002, about twenty percent of young teens (13–15) smoked worldwide, with 80,000 to 100,000 children taking up the addiction every day, roughly half of whom live in Asia. Half of those who begin smoking in adolescent years are projected to go on to smoke for 15 to 20 years.

According to the Food and Drug Administration, 90% of daily adult smokers in the United States started smoking before the age of 18. Teenagers are more likely to use e-cigarettes than cigarettes. About 31% of teenagers who use e-cigarettes started smoking within six months, compared to 8% of non-smokers. Manufacturers do not have to report what is in e-cigarettes, and most teenagers either say e-cigarettes contain only flavoring, or that they do not know what they contain.

== History ==
=== Early uses ===
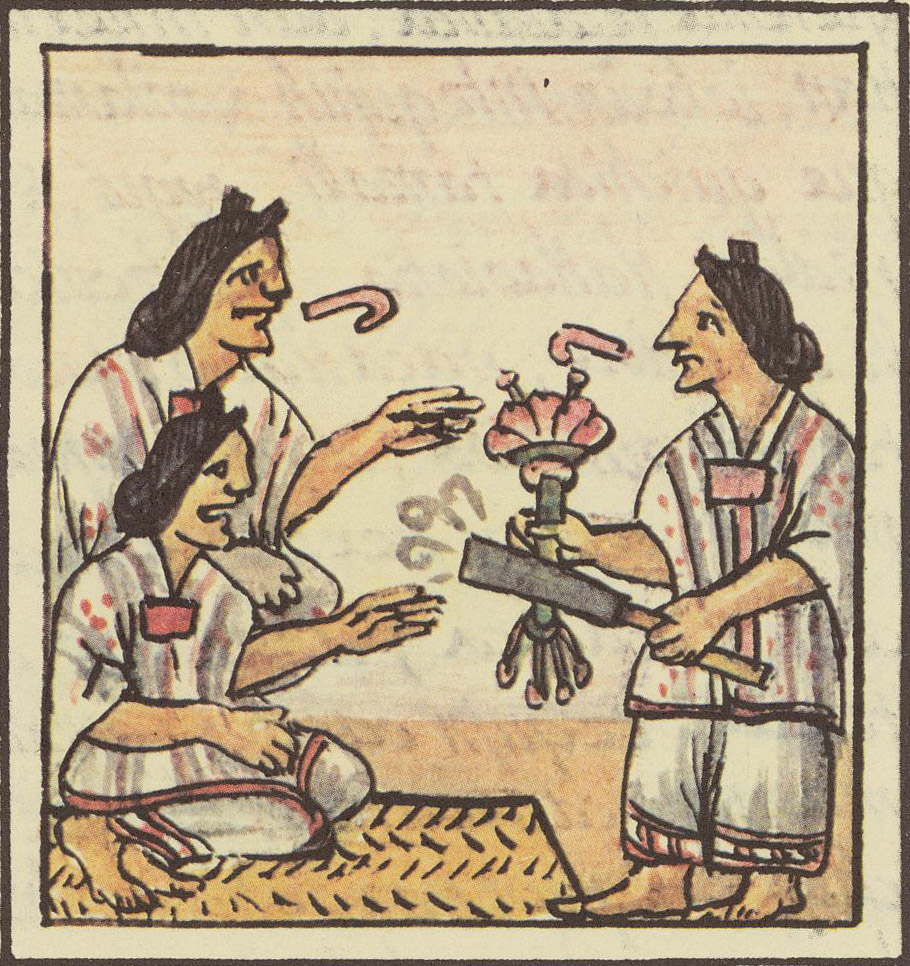
Aztec women are handed flowers and smoking tubes before eating at a banquet, Florentine Codex, 1500.

The history of smoking dates back to as early as 5000 BCE for shamanistic rituals. Many ancient civilizations, such as the Babylonian and Chinese, burnt incense as a part of religious rituals, as did the Israelites and the later Catholic and Orthodox Christian churches. Smoking in the Americas probably had its origins in the incense-burning ceremonies of shamans but was later adopted for pleasure, or as a social tool.

Substances such as cannabis, clarified butter (ghee), fish offal, dried snake skins and various pastes molded around incense sticks dates back at least 2000 years. Fumigation (dhupa) and fire offerings (homa) are prescribed in the Ayurveda for medical purposes, and have been practiced for at least 3,000 years while smoking, dhumrapana (literally "drinking smoke"), has been practiced for at least 2,000 years. Before modern times these substances have been consumed through pipes, with stems of various lengths or chillums. Archaeological findings also show the existence of pipes to smoke opium in Cyprus and Crete as soon as the Bronze Age.

Cannabis smoking was common in the Middle East before the arrival of tobacco, and was early on a common social activity that centered around the type of water pipe called a hookah. Smoking, especially after the introduction of tobacco, was an essential component of Muslim society and culture and became integrated with important traditions such as weddings, funerals and was expressed in architecture, clothing, literature and poetry.

Cannabis smoking was introduced to Sub-Saharan Africa through Ethiopia and the east African coast by either Indian or Arab traders in the 13th century or earlier and spread on the same trade routes as those that carried coffee, which originated in the highlands of Ethiopia. It was smoked in calabash water pipes with terracotta smoking bowls, apparently an Ethiopian invention which was later conveyed to eastern, southern and central Africa.

Reports from the first European explorers and conquistadors to reach the Americas tell of rituals where native priests smoked themselves into such high degrees of intoxication that it is unlikely that the rituals were limited to just tobacco.

=== Popularization ===
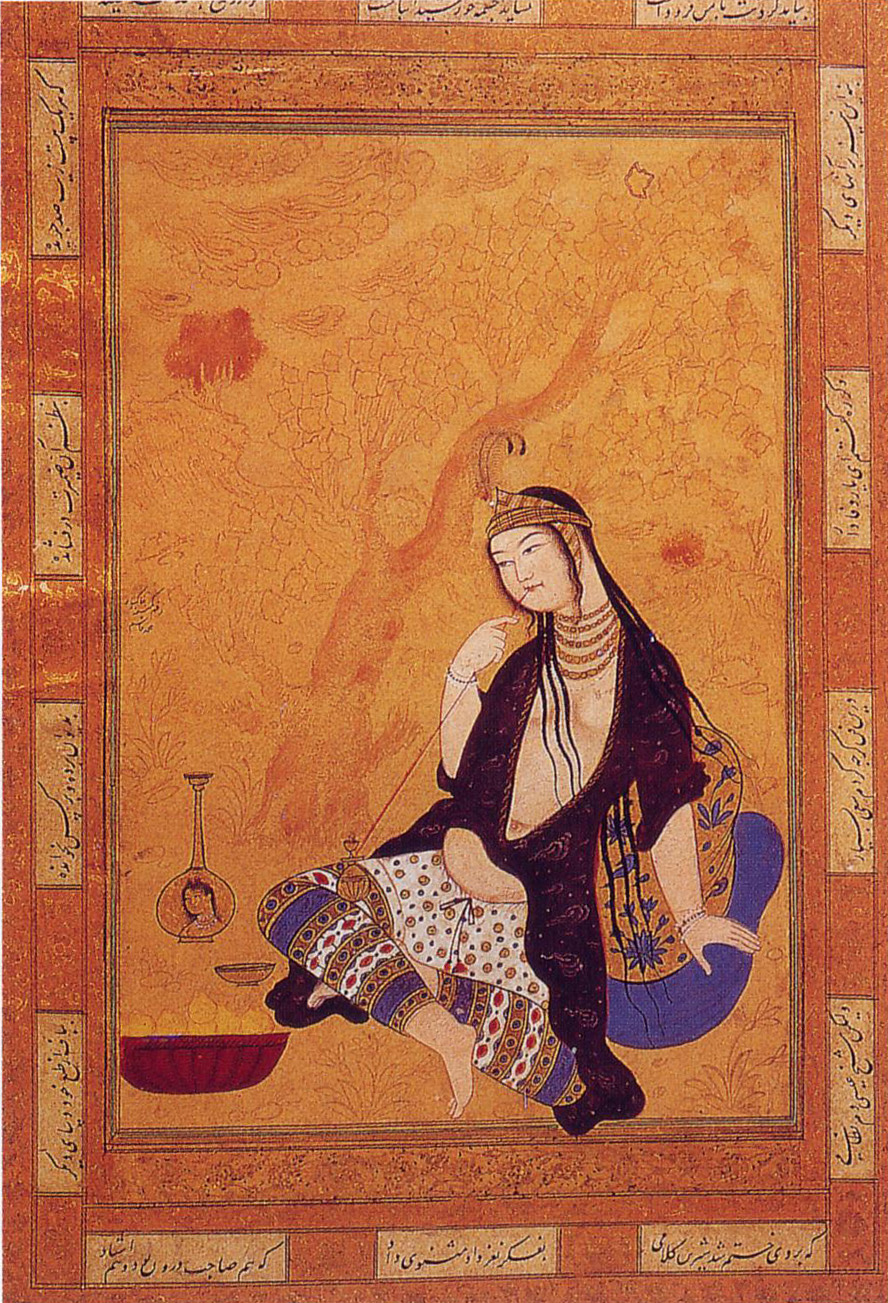
A Persian girl smoking by Muhammad Qasim, 17th century

In 1612, six years after the settlement of Jamestown, John Rolfe was credited as the first settler to successfully grow tobacco as a cash crop. The demand quickly grew as tobacco, referred to as "golden weed", revived the Virginia Company from its failed expeditions in search for gold in the Americas. In order to meet demands from the old world, tobacco was grown in succession, quickly depleting the land. This became a motivator to settle west into the unknown continent, and likewise an expansion of tobacco production. Indentured servants became the primary labor force up until Bacon's Rebellion, from which the focus turned to slavery. This trend abated following the American Revolution as slavery became regarded as unprofitable. However, the practice was revived in 1794 with the invention of the cotton gin.

The English had not settled in the Americas yet in 1604 and King James I of Great Britain issued a treatise called the King James His Counterblast to Tobacco. With the increase in popularity of tobacco as a cash crop in the English colonies of Virginia and Maryland, the treatise was reprinted in 1674.

A Frenchman named Jean Nicot (from whose name the word nicotine is derived) introduced tobacco to France in 1560. From France tobacco spread to England. The first report documents an English sailor in Bristol in 1556, seen "emitting smoke from his nostrils". Like tea, coffee and opium, tobacco was just one of many intoxicants that was originally used as a form of medicine.

Soon after its introduction to the Old World, tobacco came under frequent criticism from state and religious leaders. Murad IV, sultan of the Ottoman Empire 1623–40 was among the first to attempt a smoking ban by claiming it was a threat to public morality and health. The Chongzhen Emperor of China issued an edict banning smoking two years before his death and the overthrow of the Ming dynasty. Later, the Manchu rulers of the Qing dynasty, would proclaim smoking "a more heinous crime than that even of neglecting archery". In Edo period Japan, some of the earliest tobacco plantations were scorned by the shōgun as being a threat to the military economy by letting valuable farmland go to waste for the use of a recreational drug instead of being used to plant food crops.

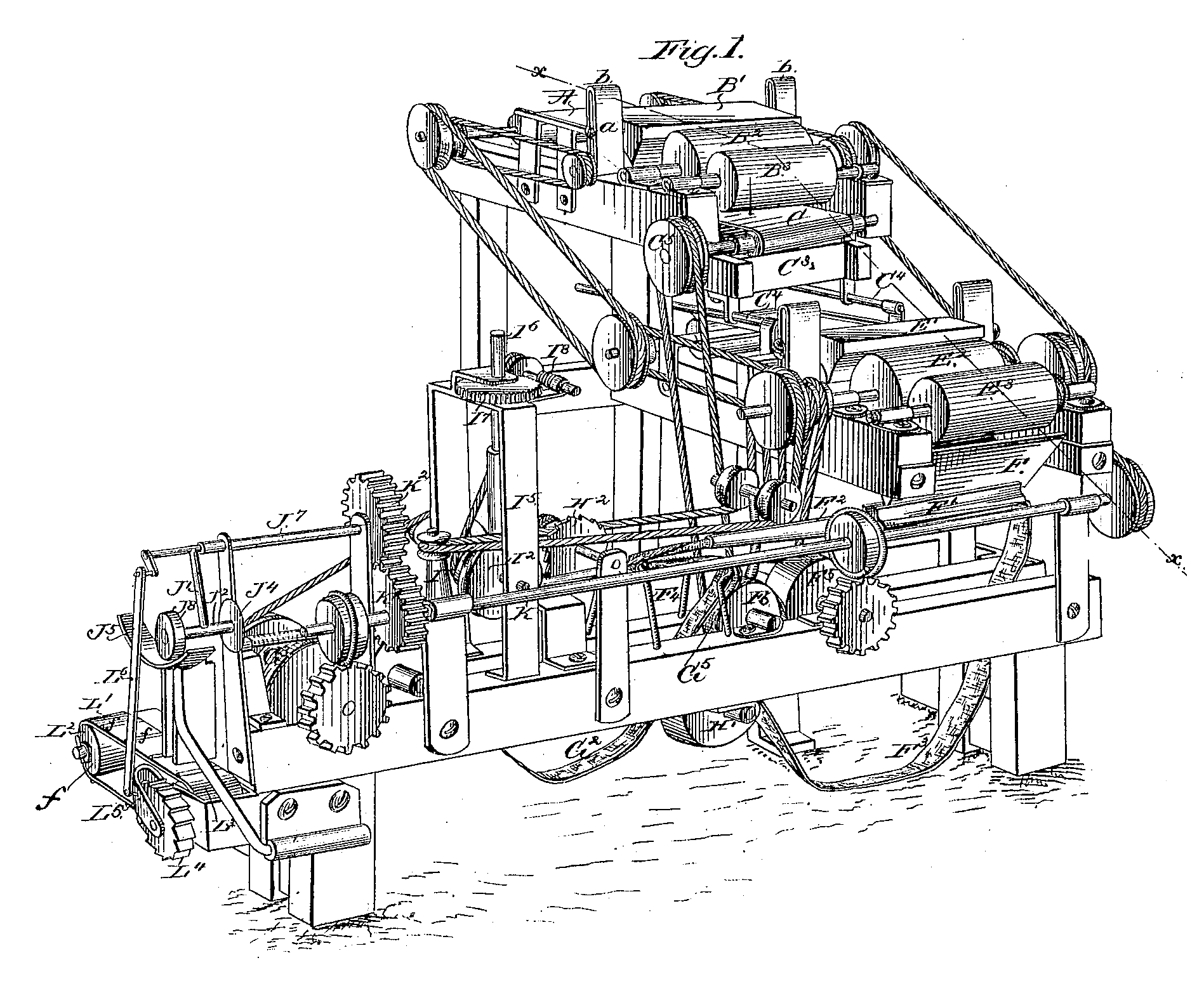
Bonsack's cigarette rolling machine, as shown on U.S. patent 238,640

Religious leaders have often been prominent among those who considered smoking immoral or outright blasphemous. In 1634, the Patriarch of Moscow and all Rus' forbade the sale of tobacco and sentenced men and women who flouted the ban to have their nostrils slit and their backs whipped until skin came off their backs. The Western church leader Pope Urban VII likewise condemned smoking in a papal bull of 1590. Despite many concerted efforts, restrictions and bans were almost universally ignored. When James VI and I, a staunch anti-smoker and the author of A Counterblaste to Tobacco, tried to curb the new trend by enforcing an enormous 4000% tax increase on tobacco in 1604; it proved a failure, as London had some 7,000 tobacco sellers by the early 17th century. Later, rulers would realise the futility of smoking bans and instead turned tobacco trade and cultivation into lucrative government monopolies.

By the mid-17th century every major civilization had been introduced to tobacco smoking and in many cases had already assimilated it into its culture, despite the attempts of many rulers to stamp the practice out with harsh penalties or fines. Tobacco, both product, and plant followed the major trade routes to major ports and markets, and then on into the hinterlands. The English language term smoking was coined in the late 18th century; before then the practice was referred to as drinking smoke.

Tobacco and cannabis were used in Sub-Saharan Africa, much like elsewhere in the world, to confirm social relations, but also created entirely new ones. In what is today Congo, a society called Bena Diemba ("People of Cannabis") was organized in the late 19th century in Lubuko ("The Land of Friendship"). The Bena Diemba were collectivist pacifists that rejected alcohol and herbal medicines in favor of cannabis.

The growth remained stable until the American Civil War in the 1860s, from which the primary labor force transition from slavery to sharecropping. This compounded with a change in demand, lead to the industrialization of tobacco production with the cigarette. James Albert Bonsack, a craftsman, in 1883 produced a machine to speed the production of cigarettes being able to produce 120,000 cigarettes a day. In 1890, James Buchanan Duke founded the American Tobacco Company (ATC) and put the machines into mass-productions, which led to a decline in chewing tobacco and pipe smoking use in the United States.

In 1919, more than 50% of tobacco consumption in Britain was in the form of cigarettes.

=== Opium ===
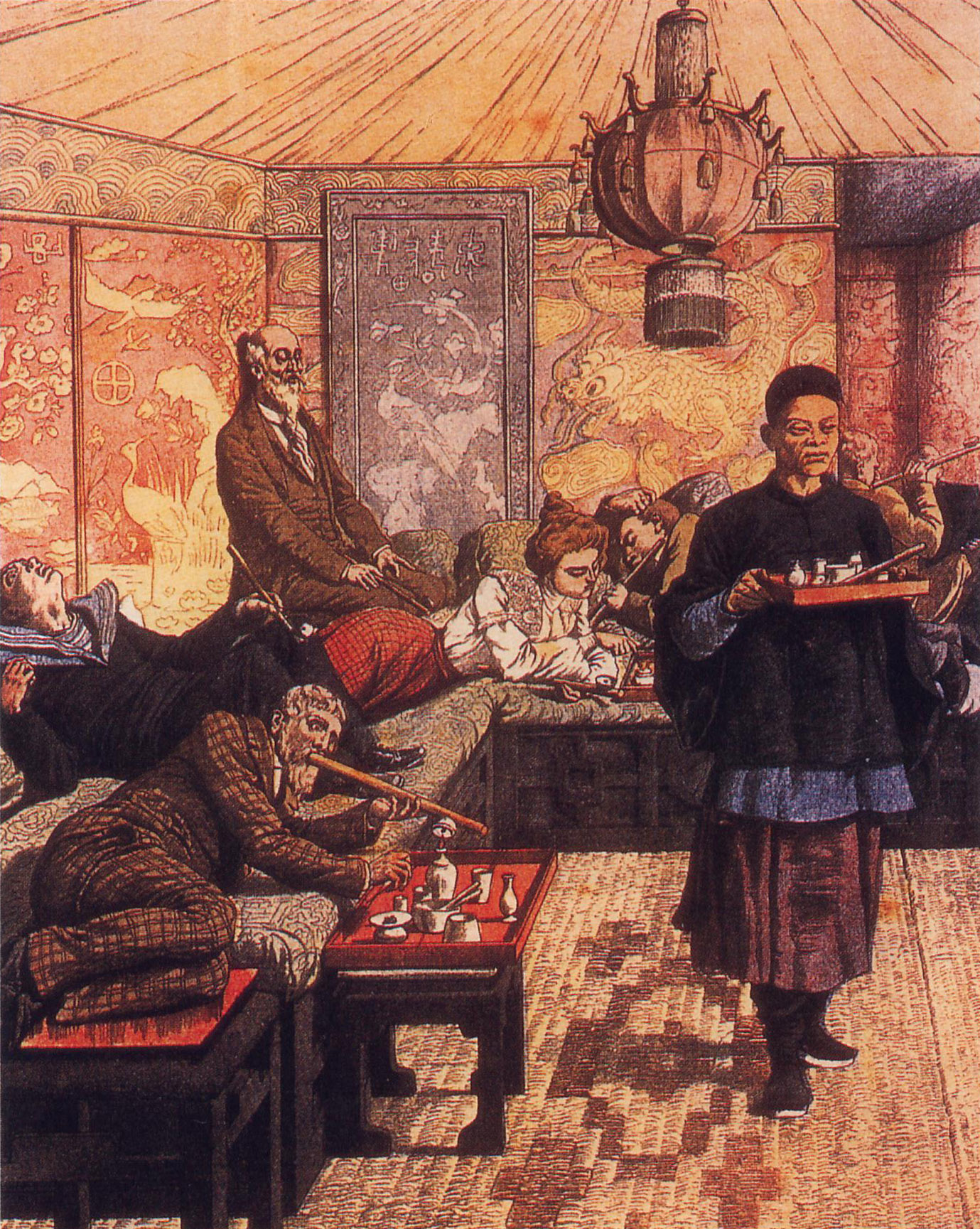
An illustration of an opium den on the cover of Le Petit Journal, 5 July 1903

In the 19th century, the practice of smoking opium became widespread in China. Previously, opium had only been ingested via consumption, and then only for its medicinal properties (opium was an anaesthetic). The narcotic was also outlawed in China sometime in the early 18th century due to the societal issues it caused. Due to a massive trade imbalance, however, foreign merchants started to smuggle opium into China via Canton, to the chagrin of the Chinese authorities. Attempts by Chinese official Lin Zexu to eliminate the trade led to the outbreak of the First Opium War. The Chinese defeat in the First and Second Opium Wars resulted in the legalization of the importation of opium into China.

Opium smoking later spread with Chinese immigrants and spawned many infamous opium dens in Chinatowns around South and Southeast Asia, Europe and the Americas. In the latter half of the 19th century, opium smoking became popular in the artistic community in Europe, especially Paris; artists' neighborhoods such as Montparnasse and Montmartre became virtual "opium capitals". While opium dens that catered primarily to emigrant Chinese continued to exist in Chinatowns around the world, the trend among the European artists largely abated after the outbreak of World War I. The consumption of Opium abated in China during the Cultural Revolution in the 1960s and 1970s.

=== Anti-tobacco movement ===
Many people have been critical about tobacco use since it gained popularity. In 1798, Dr. Benjamin Rush (early American physician, signer of the Declaration of Independence, Surgeon General under George Washington, and anti-tobacco activist) was "against the habitual use of tobacco" because he believed it "led to a desire for strong drink, was injurious both to health and morals, is generally offensive to" nonsmokers, "produces a want of respect for" nonsmokers, and "always disposes to unkind and unjust behavior towards them".

With the modernization of cigarette production compounded with the increased life expectancies during the 1920s, adverse health effects began to become more prevalent. In Germany, anti-smoking groups, often associated with anti-liquor groups, first published advocacy against the consumption of tobacco in the journal Der Tabakgegner (The Tobacco Opponent) in 1912 and 1932. In 1929, Fritz Lickint of Dresden, Germany, published a paper containing formal statistical evidence of a lung cancer–tobacco link. During the Great Depression, Adolf Hitler condemned his earlier smoking habit as a waste of money. This anti-smoking movement was further strengthened with Nazi reproductive policy as women who smoked were viewed as unsuitable to be wives and mothers in a German family.

By the end of the Second World War, American cigarette manufacturers quickly reentered the German black market. Illegal smuggling of tobacco became prevalent, and leaders of the Nazi anti-smoking campaign were assassinated. As part of the Marshall Plan, the United States shipped free tobacco to Germany; with 24,000 tons in 1948 and 69,000 tons in 1949. Per capita yearly cigarette consumption in post-war Germany steadily rose from 460 in 1950 to 1,523 in 1963. By the end of the 20th century, anti-smoking campaigns in Germany were unable to exceed the effectiveness of the Nazi-era climax in the years 1939–41 and German tobacco health research was described by Robert N. Proctor as "muted".

A lengthy study conducted in order to establish the strong association necessary for legislative action (US cigarette consumption per person blue, male lung cancer rate green)

In the UK and the US, an increase in lung cancer rates, formerly "among the rarest forms of disease", was noted by the 1930s, but its cause remained unknown and even the credibility of this increase was sometimes disputed as late as 1950. For example, in Connecticut, reported age-adjusted incidence rates of lung cancer among males increased 220% between 1935–39 and 1950–54. In the UK, the share of lung cancer among all cancer deaths in men increased from 1.5% in 1920 to 19.7% in 1947. Nevertheless, these increases were questioned as potentially caused by increased reporting and improved methods of diagnosis. Although several carcinogens were already known at the time (for example, benzo[a]pyrene was isolated from coal tar and demonstrated to be a potent carcinogen in 1933), none were known to be contained in adequate quantities in tobacco smoke. Richard Doll in 1950 published research in the British Medical Journal showing a close link between smoking and lung cancer. Four years later, in 1954 the British Doctors Study, a study of some 40 thousand doctors over 20 years, confirmed the link, based on which the government issued advice that smoking and lung cancer rates were related. In 1964 the United States Surgeon General's Report on Smoking and Health demonstrated the relationship between smoking and cancer. Further reports confirmed this link in the 1980s and concluded in 1986 that passive smoking was also harmful.

As scientific evidence mounted in the 1980s, tobacco companies claimed contributory negligence in litigation, arguing the adverse health effects were previously unknown or lacked substantial credibility. The Tobacco Master Settlement Agreement, originally between the four largest US tobacco companies and the Attorneys General of 46 states, restricted certain types of tobacco advertisement and required payments for health compensation; which later amounted to the largest civil settlement in United States history.

From 1965 to 2006, rates of smoking in the United States have declined from 42% to 20.8%. A significant majority of those who quit were professional, affluent men. Despite this decrease in the prevalence of consumption, the average number of cigarettes consumed per person per day increased from 22 in 1954 to 30 in 1978. This paradoxical event suggests that those who quit smoked less, while those who continued to smoke moved to smoke more light cigarettes. This trend has been paralleled by many industrialized nations as rates have either leveled-off or declined. In the developing countries, however, tobacco consumption continues to rise at 3.4% in 2002. In Africa, smoking is in most areas considered to be modern, and many of the strong adverse opinions that prevail in the West receive much less attention. As of 2008, Russia led as the top consumer of tobacco followed by Indonesia, Laos, Ukraine, Belarus, Greece, Jordan, and China.

At the global scale, initial ideas of an international convention towards the prevention of tobacco had been initiated in the World Health Assembly (WHA) in 1996. In 1998, along with the successful election of Dr. Gro Harlem Brundtland as the Director-General, the World Health Organization set tobacco control as its leading health concern and has begun a program known as the Tobacco Free Initiative (TFI) in order to reduce rates of consumption in the developing world. However, it was not until 21 May 2003 that the Framework Convention on Tobacco Control (FCTC) was accepted in WHA and entered into force in 2005. FCTC marked a milestone as the first international treaty concerning a global health issue that aims to combat tobacco in multiple aspects including tobacco taxes, advertisement, trading, environmental affects, health influences, etc.

The birth of this evidence-based and systematic approach has resulted in the reinforcement of tobacco taxes and the implementation of smoke-free laws in 128 countries that led to the decrease of smoking prevalence in developing nations. In Nepal, a health campaign lasting two weeks called "Smokers are not selfish" is started on the occasion of Valentine's Day and Vasant panchami to motivate individuals to quit smoking as a sacrifice for their loved ones and making it a meaningful decision of life. This campaign is attracting public attention.

=== Other substances ===
In the early 1980s, organized international trafficking of cocaine grew. However, overproduction and tighter legal enforcement for the illegal product caused drug dealers to convert the powder to "crack" – a solid, smokable form of cocaine that could be sold in smaller quantities to more people. This trend abated in the 1990s as increased police action coupled with a robust economy caused many potential consumers to give up or fail to take up the habit.

== Prevention ==
Education and counselling by physicians of children and adolescents has been found to be effective in decreasing the risk of tobacco use. Concerns have been raised that non-combustible nicotine products could lead adolescents and young adults to start smoking cigarettes later on. However, the observed associations between vaping and subsequent cigarette smoking do not necessarily indicate a causal "gateway effect", as shared social, behavioral, or genetic risk factors may contribute to both behaviors. Systematic reviews show that psychosocial interventions can help women stop smoking in late pregnancy, reducing low birthweight and preterm births. A 2016 Cochrane review showed that the combination of medication and behavioural support was more effective than minimal interventions or usual care and a 2019 review "suggests that neither reducing smoking to quit nor quitting abruptly results in superior quit rates; people could therefore be given a choice of how to quit, and support provided to people who would specifically like to reduce their smoking before quitting."

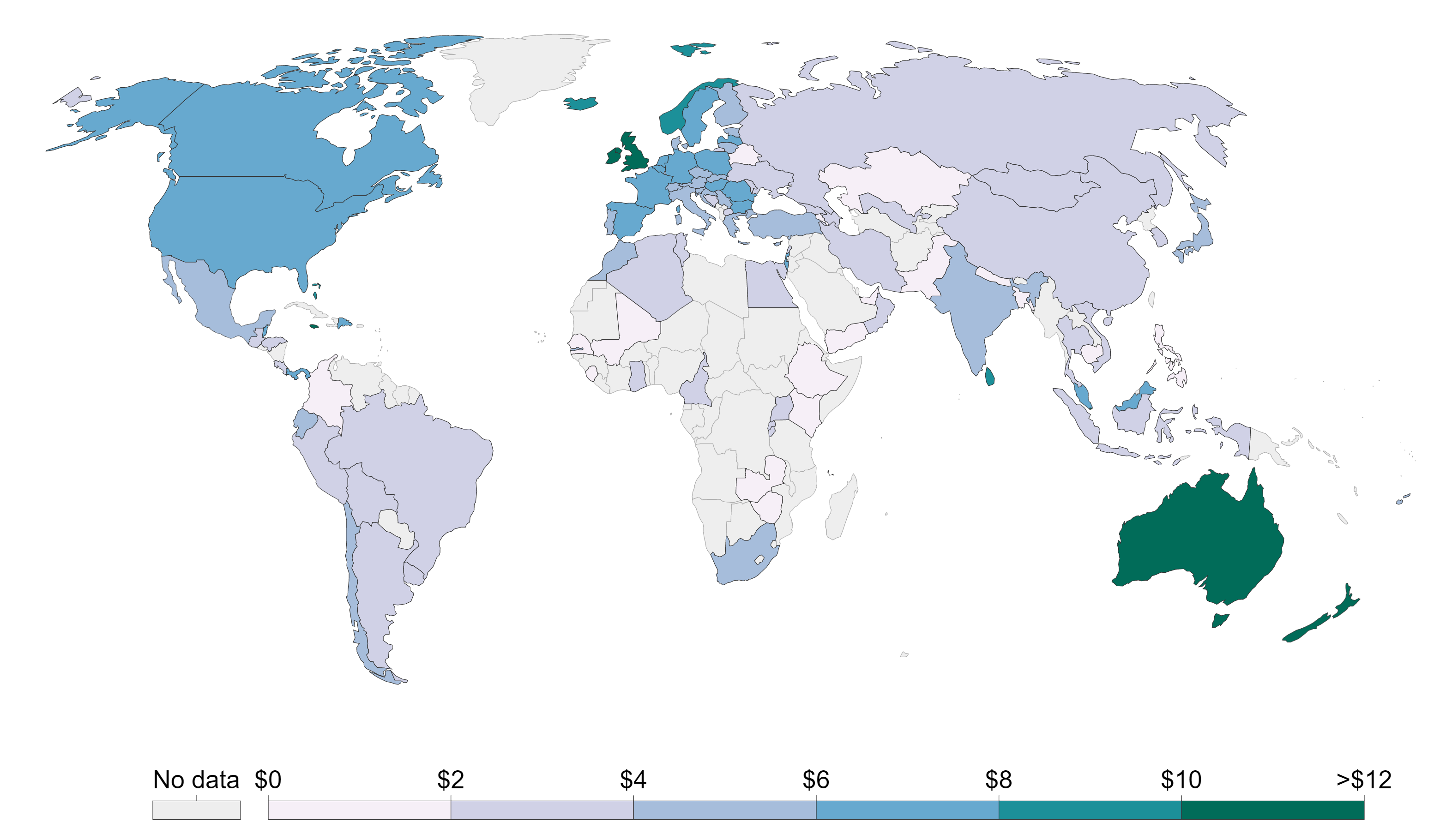
Average price of a pack of 20 cigarettes, measured in international dollars in 2014

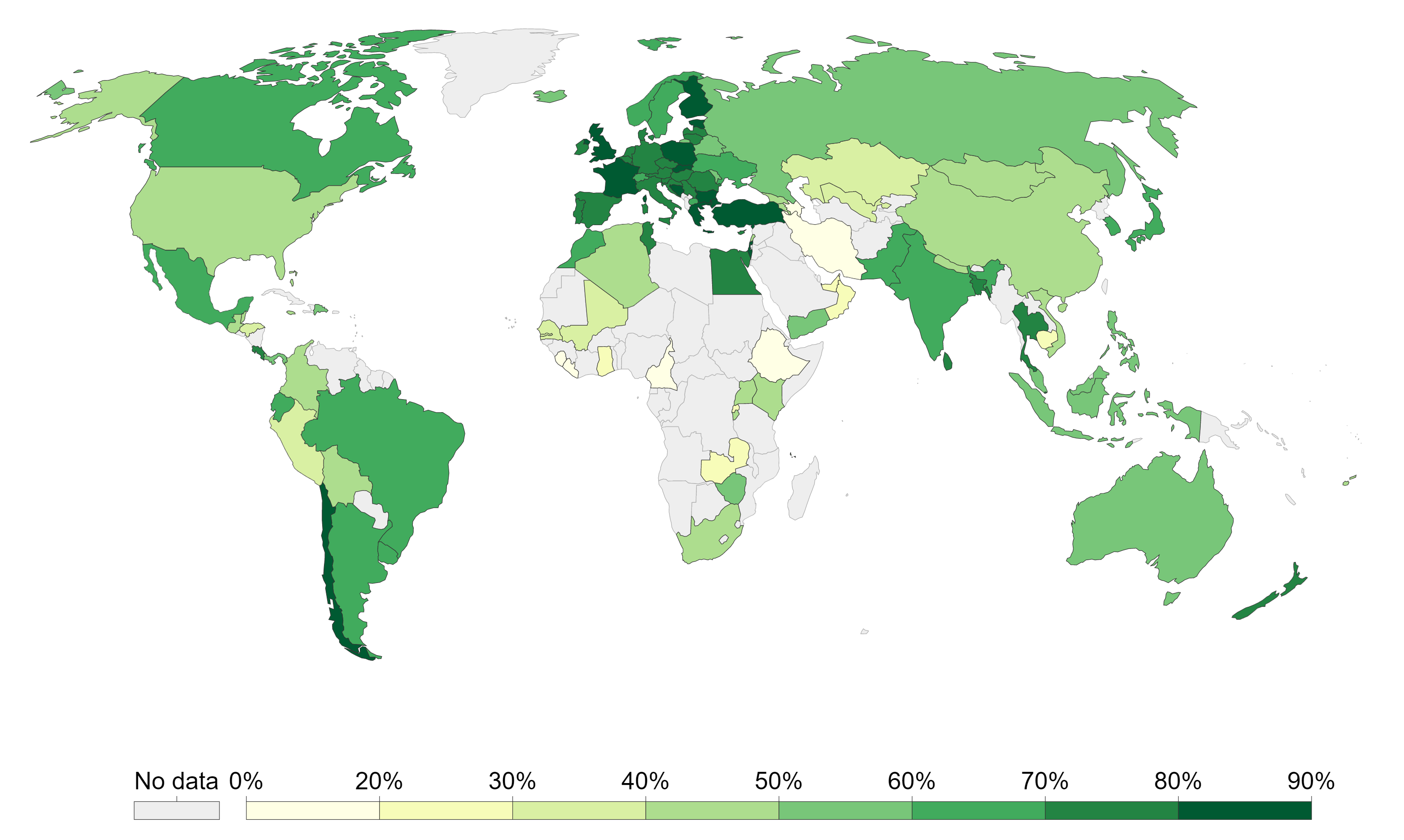
Taxes as a share of cigarette price, 2014

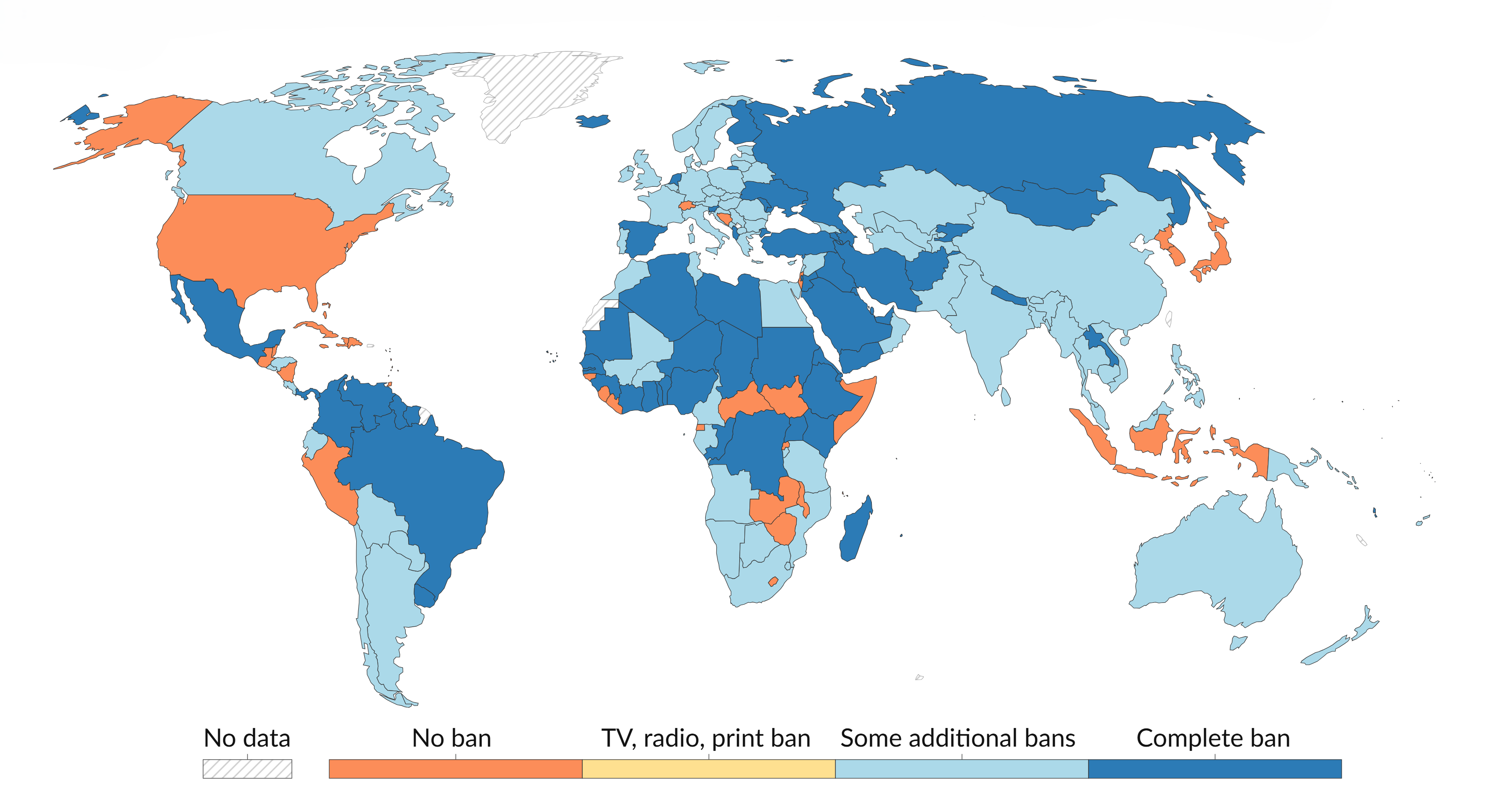
Types of bans on tobacco advertising, 2014

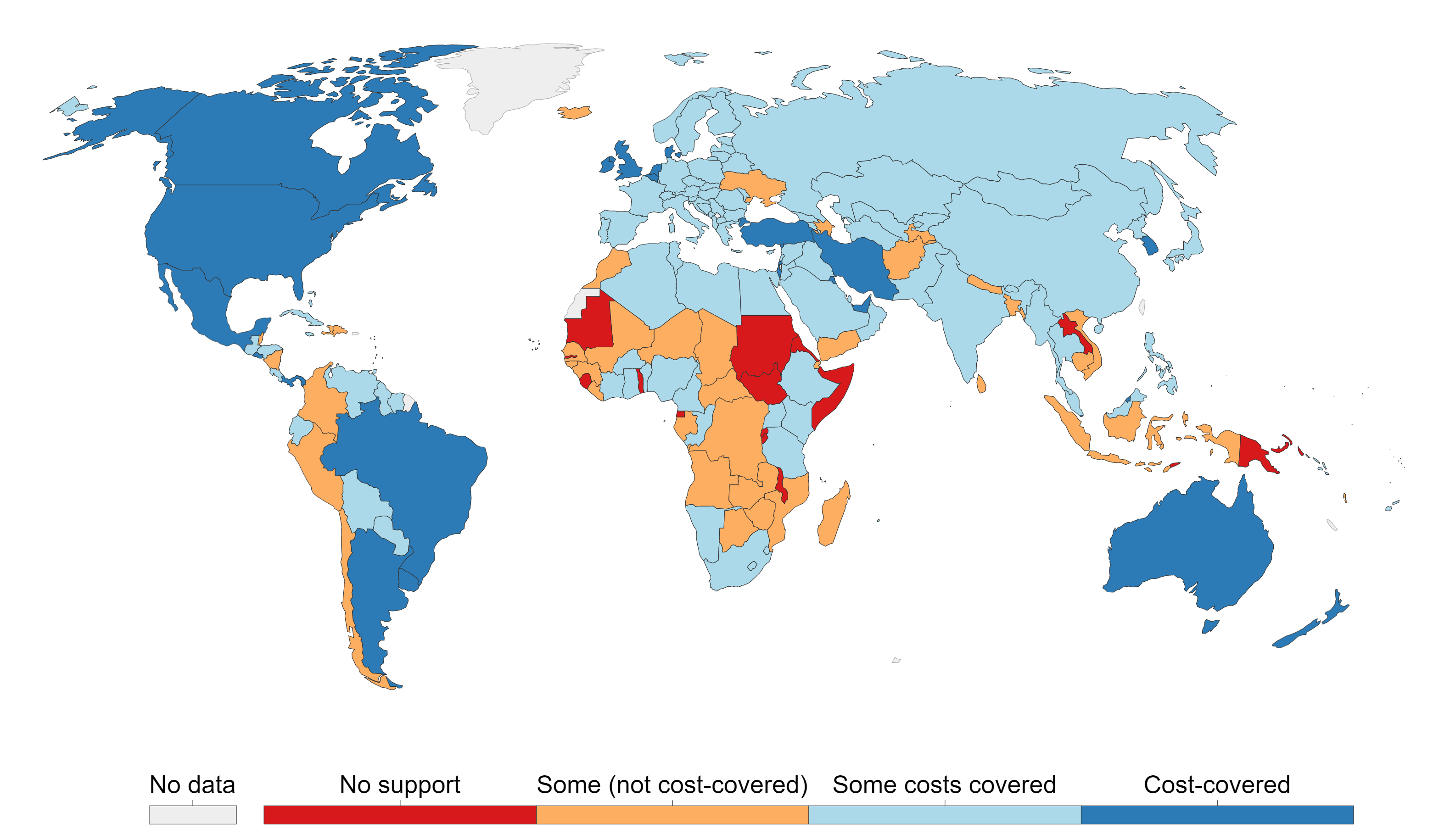
Support to help quit tobacco use, 2014

== Portrayal in society and culture ==
Cigarette smoking, which did not begin to become widespread until the late 19th century, has more associations of modernity and the faster pace of the industrialized world. Cigars have been, and still are, associated with masculinity and power and are an iconic image associated with the stereotypical capitalist. In fact, some evidence suggests that men with higher than average testosterone levels are more likely to smoke. Smoking in public has for a long time been something reserved for men and when done by women has been associated with promiscuity. In Japan during the Edo period, prostitutes and their clients would often approach one another under the guise of offering a smoke; the same was true for 19th-century Europe.

=== Art ===
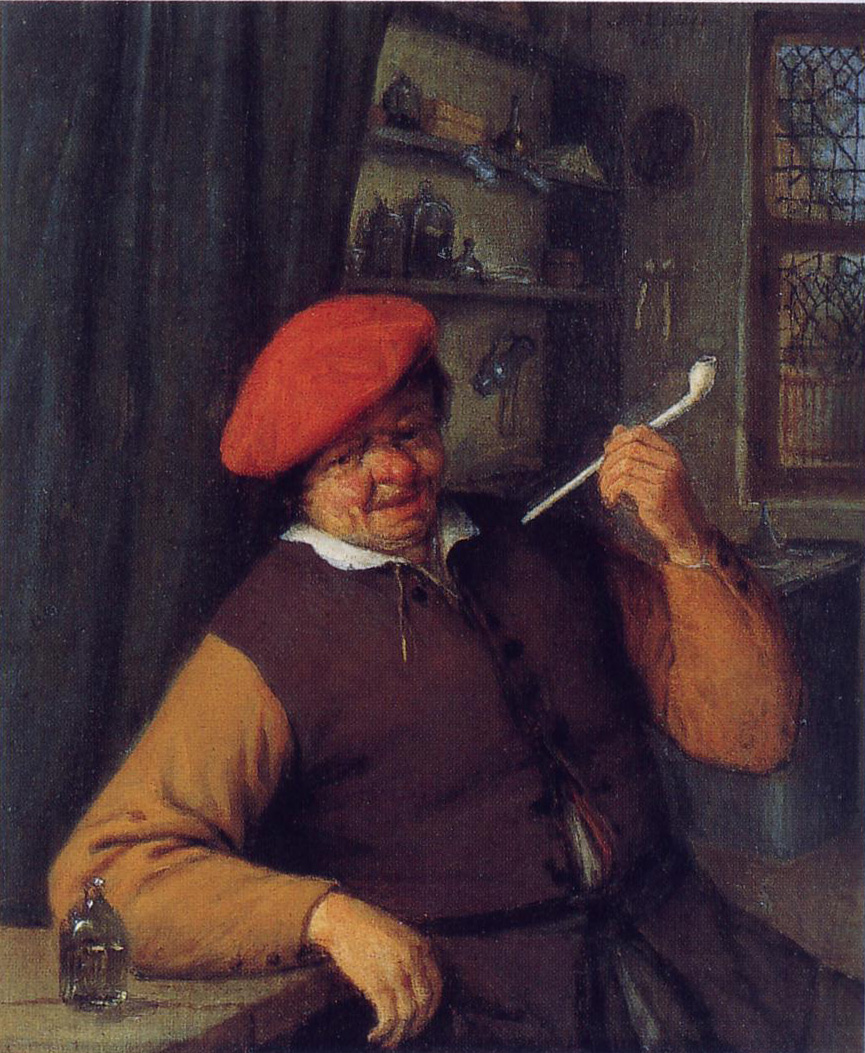
An Apothecary Smoking in an Interior by Adriaen van Ostade, oil on panel, 1646

The earliest depictions of smoking can be found on Classical Mayan pottery from around the 9th century. The art was primarily religious in nature and depicted deities or rulers smoking early forms of cigarettes. Soon after smoking was introduced outside of the Americas it began appearing in painting in Europe and Asia. The painters of the Dutch Golden Age were among the first to paint portraits of people smoking and still lifes of pipes and tobacco. For southern European painters of the 17th century, a pipe was much too modern to include in the preferred motifs inspired by mythology from Greek and Roman antiquity. At first smoking was considered lowly and was associated with peasants.

In the 18th century smoking became far more sparse in painting as the elegant practice of taking snuff became popular. Smoking a pipe was again relegated to portraits of lowly commoners and country folk and the refined sniffing of shredded tobacco followed by sneezing was rare in art. When smoking appeared it was often in the exotic portraits influenced by Orientalism. Many proponents of postcolonialism controversially believe this portrayal was a means of projecting an image of European superiority over its colonies and a perception of the male dominance of a feminized Orient. Proponents believe the theme of the exotic and alien "Other" escalated in the 19th century, fueled by the rise in the popularity of ethnology during the Enlightenment.

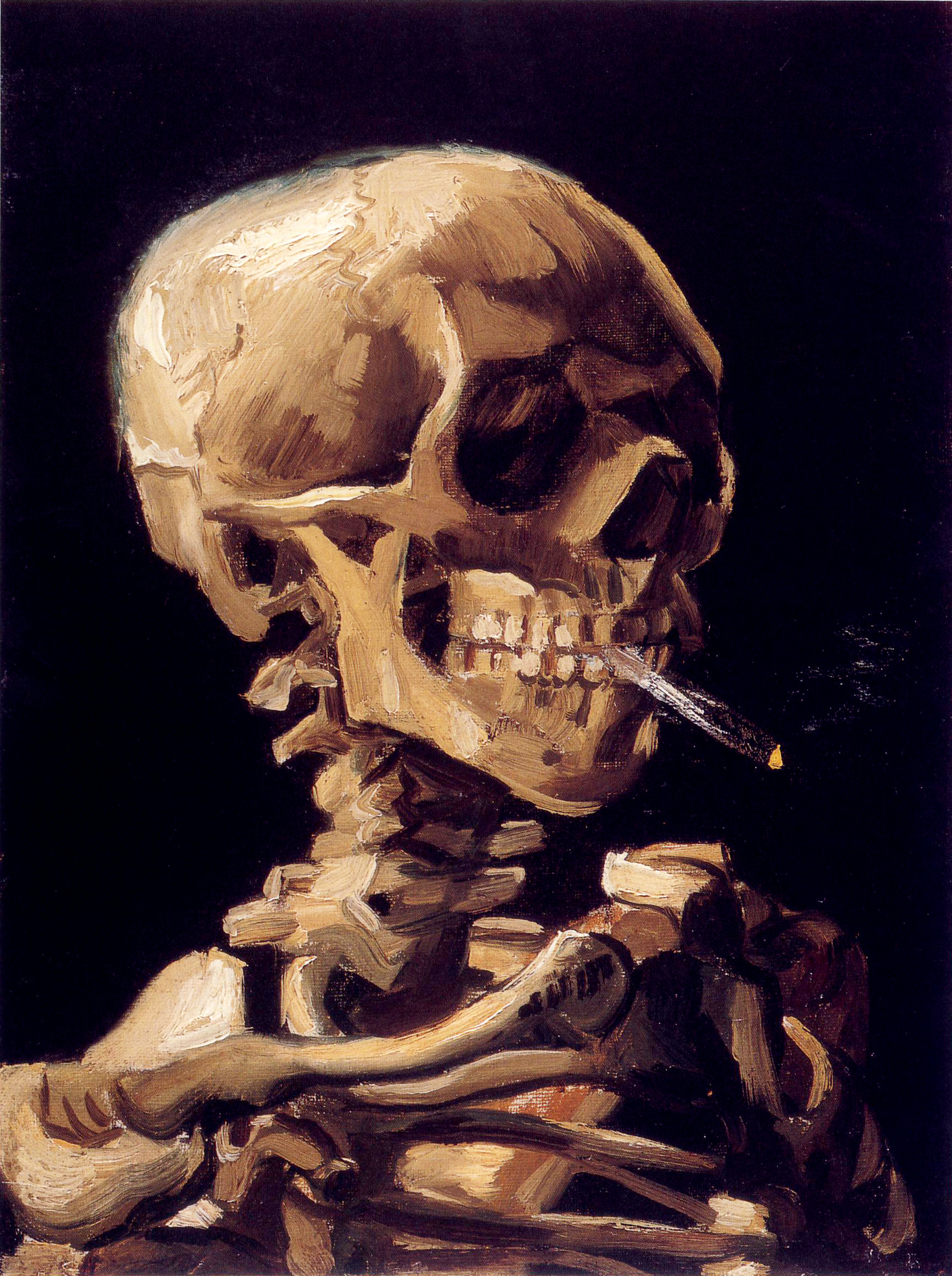
Skull with a Burning Cigarette by Vincent van Gogh, oil on canvas, 1885

In the 19th century smoking was common as a symbol of simple pleasures; the pipe smoking "noble savage", solemn contemplation by Classical Roman ruins, scenes of an artist becoming one with nature while slowly toking a pipe. The newly empowered middle class also found a new dimension of smoking as a harmless pleasure enjoyed in smoking saloons and libraries. Smoking a cigarette or a cigar would also become associated with the Bohemian, someone who shunned the conservative middle class values and displayed his contempt for conservatism. But this was a pleasure that was to be confined to a male world; women smokers were associated with prostitution and smoking was not considered an activity fit for proper ladies. It was not until the start of the 20th century that smoking women would appear in paintings and photos, giving a chic and charming impression. Impressionists like Vincent van Gogh, who was a pipe smoker himself, would also begin to associate smoking with gloom and fin-du-siècle fatalism. While the symbolism of the cigarette, pipe and cigar respectively were consolidated in the late 19th century, it was not until the 20th century that artists began to use it fully; a pipe would stand for thoughtfulness and calm; the cigarette symbolized modernity, strength and youth, but also nervous anxiety; the cigar was a sign of authority, wealth and power. The decades following World War II, during the apex of smoking when the practice had still not come under fire by the growing anti-smoking movement, a cigarette casually tucked between the lips represented the young rebel, epitomized in actors like Marlon Brando and James Dean or mainstays of advertising like the Marlboro Man. It was not until the 1970s when the negative aspects of smoking began to appear, yielding the image of the unhealthy lower-class individual, reeking of cigarette smoke and lack of motivation and drive, which was especially prominent in art inspired or commissioned by anti-smoking campaigns.

=== Film and TV ===
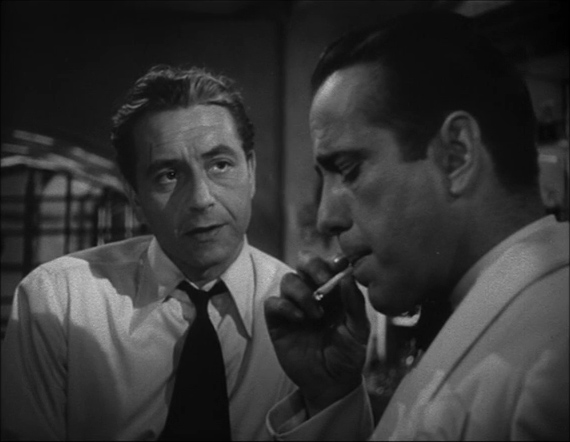
Film star and iconic smoker Humphrey Bogart

Ever since the era of silent films, smoking has had a major part in film symbolism. In the hard-boiled film noir crime thrillers, cigarette smoke often frames characters and is frequently used to add an aura of mystique or nihilism.

Since World War II, smoking has gradually become less frequent on screen as the obvious health hazards of smoking have become more widely known. With the anti-smoking movement gaining greater respect and influence, conscious attempts not to show smoking on screen are now undertaken in order to avoid encouraging smoking or giving it positive associations, particularly for family films. Smoking on screen is more common today among characters who are portrayed as anti-social or even criminal.

According to a 2019 study, the introduction of television in the United States led to a substantial increase in smoking, in particular among 16–21-year-olds. The study suggested "that television increased the share of smokers in the population by 5–15 percentage points, generating roughly 11 million additional smokers between 1946 and 1970."

In the United States, a 2019 analysis by the Centers for Disease Control and Prevention of top-grossing films released during 2010–2018 found that, although the number of films with any tobacco imagery remained stable, the total number of tobacco incidents in those films increased by 57%, including a 120% increase in PG-13-rated movies.

The same year, following criticism of smoking depictions in some of its programmes, Netflix announced that future original series rated TV-14 or below and films rated PG-13 or below would not include smoking or e-cigarette use, except where needed for reasons of historical or factual accuracy, and that depictions in higher-rated productions would be limited to cases where smoking was considered essential to the creative vision or characterisation.

A 2022 report from the U.S. public health organisation Truth Initiative on streaming and broadcast television found that 60% of the 15 favourite 2020 season releases for young adults included smoking, and estimated that these programmes exposed about 27 million youths to tobacco imagery.

=== Literature ===
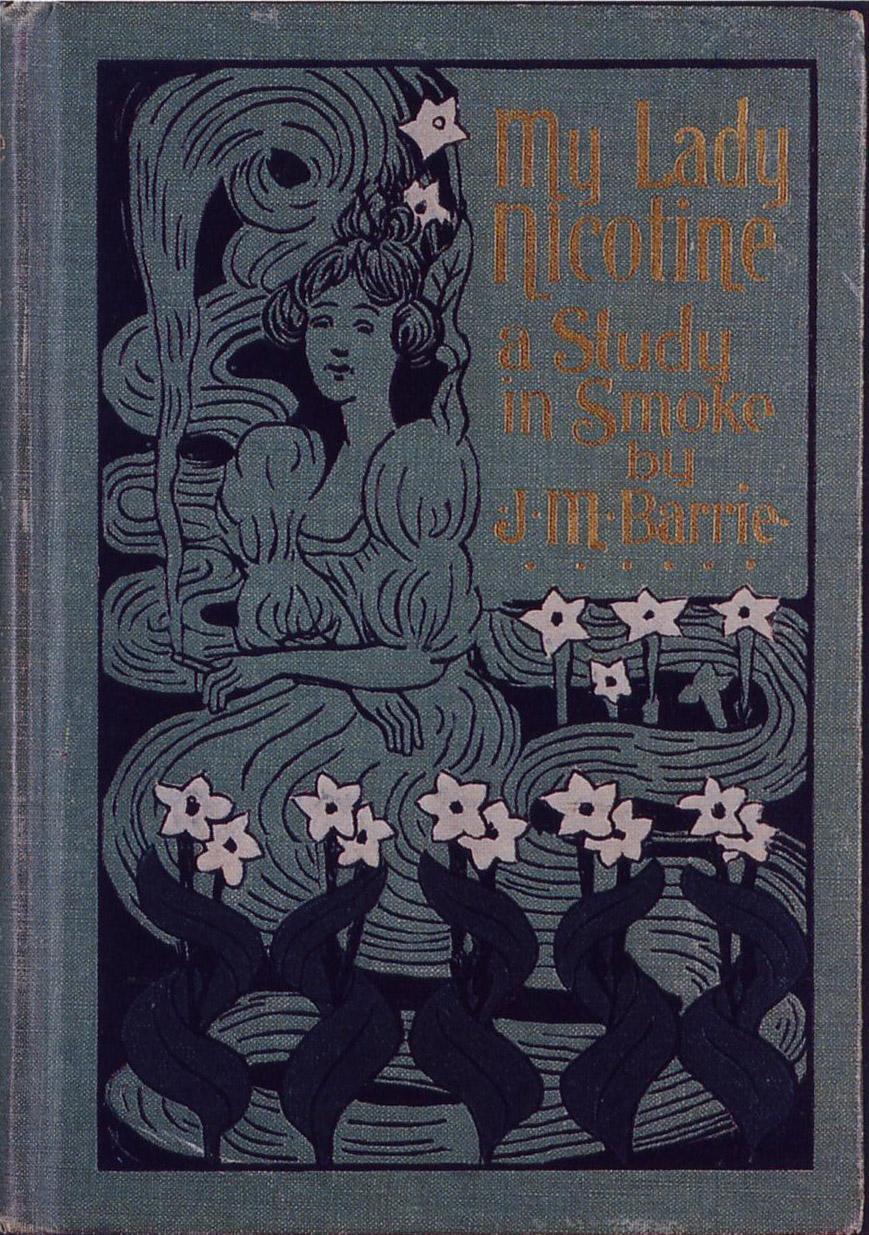
The cover of My Lady Nicotine: A Study in Smoke (1896) by J.M. Barrie, otherwise best known for his play Peter Pan

Just as in other types of fiction, smoking has had an important place in literature and smokers are often portrayed as characters with great individuality, or outright eccentrics, something typically personified in one of the most iconic smoking literary figures of all, Sherlock Holmes. Other than being a frequent part of short stories and novels, smoking has spawned endless eulogies, praising its qualities and affirming the author's identity as a devoted smoker. Especially during the late 19th century and early 20th century, a panoply of books with titles like Tobacco: Its History and associations (1876), Cigarettes in Fact and Fancy (1906) and Pipe and Pouch: The Smokers Own Book of Poetry (1905) were written in the UK and the US. The titles were written by men for other men and contained general tidbits and poetic musings about the love for tobacco and all things related to it, and frequently praised the refined bachelor's life. The Fragrant Weed: Some of the Good Things Which Have been Said or Sung about Tobacco, published in 1907, contained, among many others, the following lines from the poem A Bachelor's Views by Tom Hall that were typical of the attitude of many of the books:

So let us drink
To her, – but think
Of him who has to keep her;
And sans a wife
Let's spend our life
In bachelordom, – it's cheaper.

— Eugene Umberger

These works were all published in an era before the cigarette had become the dominant form of tobacco consumption and pipes, cigars, and chewing tobacco were still commonplace. Many of the books were published in novel packaging that would attract the learned smoking gentleman. Pipe and Pouch came in a leather bag resembling a tobacco pouch and Cigarettes in Fact and Fancy (1901) came bound in leather, packaged in an imitation cardboard cigar box. By the late 1920s, the publication of this type of literature largely abated and was only sporadically revived in the later 20th century.

=== Music ===
There have been few examples of tobacco in music in early modern times, though there are occasional signs of influence in pieces such as Johann Sebastian Bach's Enlightening Thoughts of a Tobacco-Smoker. However, from the early 20th century and onwards smoking has been closely associated with popular music. Jazz was from early on closely intertwined with the smoking that was practiced in the venues where it was played, such as bars, dance halls, jazz clubs and even brothels. The rise of jazz coincided with the expansion of the modern tobacco industry, and in the United States also contributed to the spread of cannabis. The latter went under names like "tea", "muggles" and "reefer" in the jazz community and was so influential in the 1920s and 30s that it found its way into songs composed at the time such as Louis Armstrong's Muggles, Larry Adler's Smoking Reefers, and Don Redman's Chant of The Weed. The popularity of marijuana among jazz musicians remained high until the 1940s and 50s, when it was partially replaced by the use of heroin.

Another form of modern popular music that has been closely associated with cannabis smoking is reggae, a style of music that originated in Jamaica in the late 1950s and early 60s. Cannabis, or ganja, is believed to have been introduced to Jamaica in the mid-19th century by Indian immigrant labor and was primarily associated with Indian workers until it was appropriated by the Rastafari movement in the middle of the 20th century. The Rastafari considered cannabis smoking to be a way to come closer to God, or Jah, an association that was greatly popularized by reggae icons such as Bob Marley and Peter Tosh in the 1960s and 70s.

=== Economics ===
In the United States, cigarette smoking is estimated to cost the economy more than $96.8 billion a year in lost productivity from premature death, and more than $225 billion a year in smoking-attributable healthcare spending as of 2014 based on data from 2010–2014.

== Smoking in the armed forces ==
The importance of tobacco to soldiers was early on recognized as something that could not be ignored by commanders. By the 17th century, allowances of tobacco were a standard part of the naval rations of many nations and, by World War I, cigarette manufacturers and governments collaborated in securing tobacco and cigarette allowances to soldiers in the field. It was asserted that regular use of tobacco while under duress would not only calm the soldiers but allow them to withstand greater hardship. Until the mid-20th century, the majority of the adult population in many Western nations were smokers and the claims of anti-smoking activists were met with much skepticism, if not outright contempt. Smoking in the armed forces has become discouraged. Within the UK Armed Forces, 27% of personnel smoked in 2011, with this declining to 18% by 2020. In the US military, smokers are at higher risk of sustaining injuries in training and of being discharged prematurely.

== See also ==
- Cigarette smoking for weight loss
- Electronic cigarette
- Outline of smoking
- Plain tobacco packaging
- Reverse smoking
- Schizophrenia and tobacco smoking
- Smoke social
- Varenicline
- Smoker's paradox
- Smoking in association football
- Cigar etiquette
