= Smoker's face =

Changes that happen to the faces of smokers

Smoker's face describes the characteristic changes that happen to the faces of many people who smoke tobacco products. Smoking causes damage to the skin by depleting the skin of oxygen and nutrients. The general appearance is of accelerated ageing of the face, with a characteristic pattern of facial wrinkling and sallow coloration.

A summary of a study published by the National Institutes of Health found that certain facial features appeared in about 46% of continuing smokers and 8% of former smokers who had smoked a full decade while those same features were absent in a control group of non-smokers.

== Causes ==
Matrix metalloproteinases (MMP's) are enzymes that promote breakdown of the extracellular matrix. This matrix contains important nutrients and proteins like collagen, elastin, and proteoglycans. All of which are involved in skin health and structure. The MMP levels in a smoker are elevated, causing excessive breakdown of the matrix. Therefore, those essential proteins and antioxidants, like Vitamin C, also begin to disappear. This leaves the skin empty and depleted of its structure, causing hollowness and sagging of the skin.

Nearby blood vessels can become damaged by the tobacco extracts and then constrict, reducing flow of oxygen to the face. Oxygen breakdown without circulation causes reactive oxygen species, or ROS and free radicals, to build up. Then skin, now deplete of antioxidants, cannot clean up the free radicals leaving them to build up in the tissues. This eventually leads to oxidative stress. This is attributed to what is called extrinsic aging; known to be caused by external and environmental factors. This can cause skin allergies, skin thinning, wrinkles, issues with pigmentation, cancers and more. Important enzymes like glutathione peroxidase and glutathione reductase, which help clean up the extracellular matrix also become reduced.

== Symptoms and Appearance ==
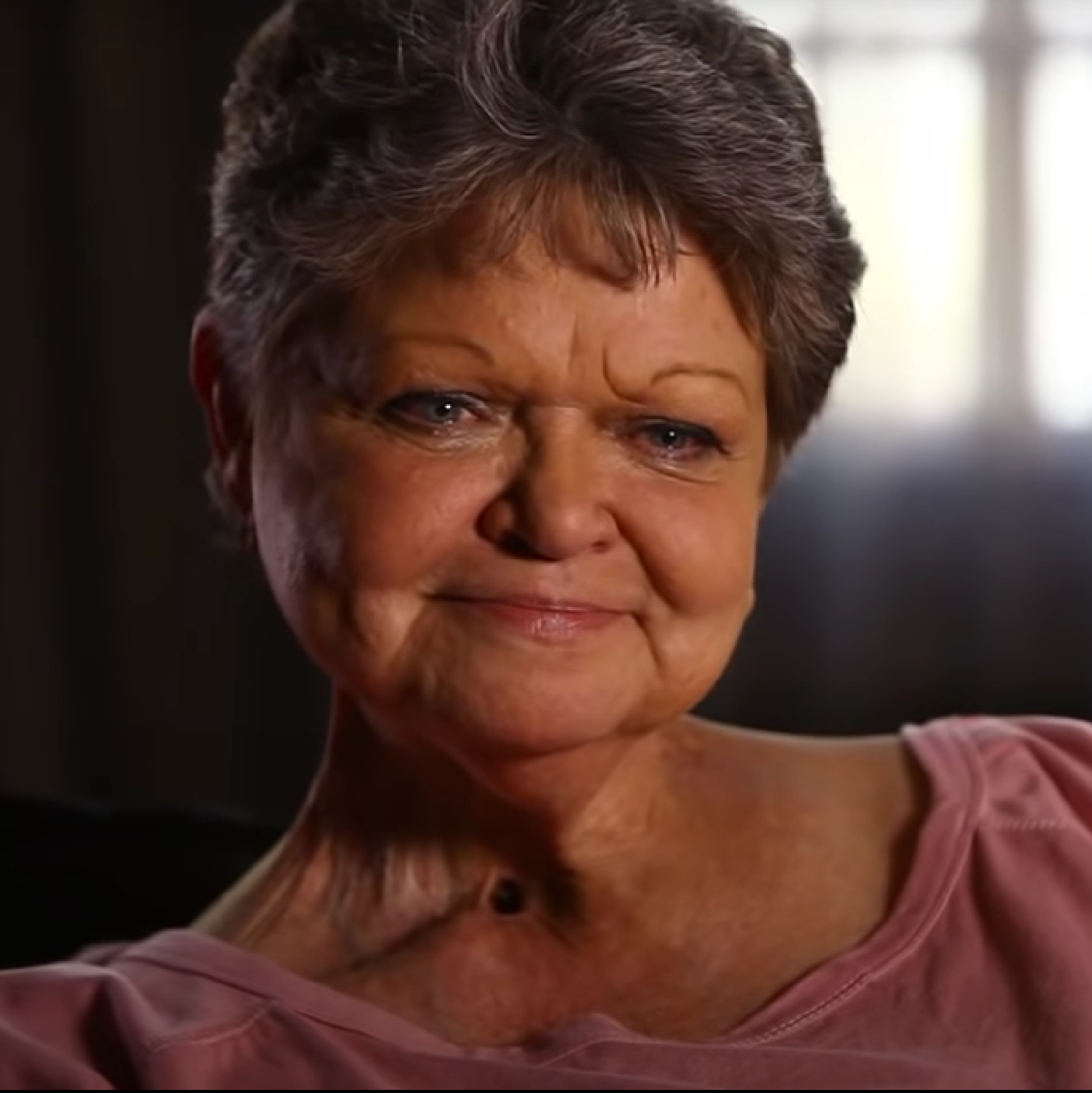
Debi Austin, a well known anti-smoking activist. Seen in her neck is a surgically made stoma made to treat her laryngeal cancer caused by her tobacco use.

=== Skin ===
- Wrinkles
- Sagging
- Premature aging
- Greyish skin tone
- Cancer

=== Hair ===
- Hair loss

=== Mouth ===
- Gum disease
- Tooth decay
- Tooth loss
- Dry socket
- Bad or decreased sense of taste
- Halitosis
- Whitening of oral soft tissue
- Mouth cancer
- Staining or yellowing

== Related Conditions ==
- Diabetes
- Tuberculosis
- Heart Disease
- Stroke
- Lung disease
- Chronic Obstructive Pulmonary Disease (COPD)
- Autoimmune Illnesses
- Eye Disease
- Cancers
