= Nicotine consumption and weight loss =

Weight control method

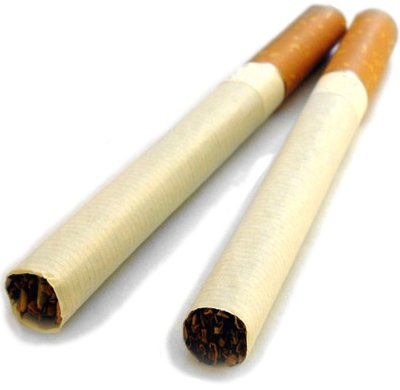
East German cigarettes

Nicotine consumption for weight loss is a weight control method whereby one consumes nicotine, often in the form of tobacco, to decrease one's appetite. The practice dates to early knowledge of nicotine as an appetite suppressant.

Tobacco smoking was associated with appetite suppression among Pre-Columbian indigenous Americans and Old World Europeans. Tobacco companies have drawn connections between slimness and smoking in their advertisements, primarily with brands and advertisements that target women. While it is unclear how many people begin or continue smoking because of weight concerns, white female adolescents with established weight-related anxieties are particularly prone to initiate smoking. Although knowledge of nicotine's effects upon the appetite can contribute to people smoking for weight control purposes, studies have not shown that people smoke exclusively to maintain or lose weight.

== Appetite suppression ==
Nicotine is an appetite suppressant. Nicotine could reduce appetite and influence an individual's eating habits. A study on nicotine's effects on appetite demonstrated that “net effects of nicotine include elevated blood pressure, heart rate, and gastric motility while eliciting a sustained decrease in food intake. Autonomic, sensory, and enteric neurons each constitute potentially important loci for nicotine-mediated changes in feeding behavior.” Thus, cultural associations between tobacco smoking and weight control in part reflect the body's physiological reactions to nicotine.

Nicotine gum has similar effects to cigarettes in terms of appetite suppression, and there are some people who do not smoke, but use nicotine gum for the purpose of weight control or weight loss.

Nicotine can lower insulin levels in a person's bloodstream, which can reduce cravings for sugary foods. Furthermore, “nicotine-triggered effects of adrenaline on the stomach’s musculature” lead to temporary feelings of subsided hunger. Other studies have shown that smokers expend more calories while engaged in activity, which echo conclusions that smokers experience heightened metabolic rates.

Smoking may be conducive to greater accumulation of visceral fat and greater insulin resistance, and increases the risk of metabolic syndrome and type 2 diabetes.

Whether smokers are actually thinner than nonsmokers is unclear. Some studies have shown that smokers—including long term and current smokers—weigh less than nonsmokers, and gain less weight over time. Conversely, certain longitudinal studies have not shown correlation between weight loss and smoking at least among young persons. While the connection between nicotine and appetite suppression, as well as other physiological responses to nicotine consumption, has been established, whether these chemical and biological reactions translate to smokers being thinner than nonsmokers is still debated.

== Perceptions of weight control among adolescents ==
While most adults do not smoke for weight control, studies have shown that associations between tobacco use, being thin, and desire for weight control do influence adolescents in terms of smoking behavior. Research indicated that adolescent girls that strongly value being thin are more likely to initiate smoking, and that weight loss or weight control are seen to be one of the positive values of smoking. Additionally, girls already engaged in risky behavior for weight control are at increased odds to begin smoking.

Several studies have been conducted over the past decade examining this issue in depth. While it has generally been found that white females are more likely to smoke to lose weight, smoking to lose or control weight is not limited to white females, but is prevalent across racial and gender boundaries. Within all racial groups, it has been found that weight concerns and negative body perceptions are a significant factor in an adolescent's decision to smoke.In a national survey of Serbian adolescents, boys who smoked had approximately twice the odds of reporting smoking for weight loss or weight control compared with girls who smoked, indicating that smoking as a weight-control strategy among adolescents is not limited to females. Compared to white male smokers, male smokers of American Indian and Asian descent, as well as male smokers of black, Hispanic and mixed descent, smoked more frequently to lose weight or control their weight. Heavy smokers and smokers who considered themselves overweight or who were concerned about their weight, reported significantly more that they used smoking as a method of weight control.

== History in advertising ==
It was not always socially acceptable for women to smoke cigarettes or use tobacco in public. However, over the course of about fifty years, advertising campaigns orchestrated by the tobacco industry changed societal attitudes, and represented tobacco use as a desirable pastime for the female consumer in both the United States and abroad.

=== Pre-1920s ===
Prior to the 1920s, smoking was largely a male pastime and was thought of as a taboo act for women to participate in. During the 19th century, smoking and cigarettes were commonly associated with loose morals and sexual promiscuity. Cigarettes came to be thought of as an occupational prop of prostitutes and sex workers, and were commonly present in Victorian-era pornography. Into the early 20th century, women faced possible arrest if they were caught smoking in public.

=== 1920–1968 ===
During the 1900s, women experienced upward socioeconomic mobility with the American women's rights movement as they gained new civil liberties. By the outbreak of World War I, as they experienced growing responsibility and freedom on the home front, an increasing number of women were using cigarettes as a tool to challenge traditional ideas about female behavior. However, it would ultimately be the tobacco industry's marketing influence that would turn the cigarette from a social liability into an accepted and desirable commodity for women to openly consume.

==== Targeting women's waistlines ====
The President of the American Tobacco Company, Percival Hill, was one of the first tobacco executives to seek out the women's market. Noting the 1920s fashion trends for bobbed hair cuts, short skirts, and slender figures, Hill saw the potential in selling cigarettes as an appetite suppressant so that women could achieve the decade's enviably small waistlines.

==== "Reach for a Lucky" ====
Created by Albert Lasker for Hill and Lucky Strike, the “Reach for a Lucky” campaign is one of the most successful, albeit controversial advertising campaigns in the history of modern advertising. Inspired by other campaigns that offered male consumers a reason why they should smoke a given brand (i.e. the Lucky Strike “It’s Toasted” campaign), Lasker sought to give the female market a reason to smoke as well.

Borrowing from the 19th-century slogan of Lydia Pinkham's Vegetable Compound, “Reach for a Vegetable,” that was marketed towards women for the alleviation of menstrual discomfort, Lasker and Lucky Strike launched the “Reach for a Lucky Instead of a Sweet” campaign in 1925, followed by “For a Slender Figure—Reach for a Lucky Instead of a Sweet” in 1928. The print advertisement was disseminated by Edward Bernays throughout the fashion industry in numerous fashion magazines and daily newspapers featuring slender Parisian models and proclaiming the dangers of sugar consumption. Famously, Amelia Earhart would also serve as a spokeswoman for the “Reach for a Lucky” campaign.

Early on, the print advertisements simply featured an attractive woman with any of the variations of the slogan above or underneath her, accompanied by a rendering of the Lucky Strike Box. Later, the advertisements would make a more pointed statement about weight gain, featuring either a man or a woman in profile view with his or her noticeably fatter shadow silhouette behind. While these early advertisements would focus on both men and women, later variations would target women specifically.

In The Cigarette Century, Allen Brandt explains that the campaign was revolutionary in its pointed targeting of female consumers as well as in its aggressive marketing strategy that positioned it in direct opposition with candy manufacturers. Shortly after the campaign was released, the National Confectioners Association fired back at Lucky Strike, threatening legal action and publishing anti-cigarette literature that asserted the importance of candy in a balanced, healthy diet. The dispute between Lucky Strike and the National Confectioners Association ultimately drew the attention of the Federal Trade Commission who ordered Lucky Strike to “relinquish all dietary claims for Luckies” in its advertising.

Importantly, this campaign would serve to create a significant association between cigarettes and the feminine values of style, beauty and slimness. Moreover, Allen Brandt writes that the campaign ultimately “promoted a product and a behavior that...possessed specific and appealing social meanings of glamour, beauty, autonomy, and equality” that would come to be synonymous in future cigarette advertising campaigns targeting female consumers. Lucky Strike's message was highly effective, raising the company's market share by more than 200% and making it the most profitable cigarette brand for two years running.

==== "Torches of Freedom" ====
After the “Reach for a Lucky Campaign,” Lucky Strike sought to forever change smoking taboos by encouraging women to smoke openly in public. In an infamous publicity stunt, Edward Bernays hired several young, attractive women to march in the Easter Sunday parade in New York brandishing their “torches of freedom”—their Lucky Strike cigarettes. While this campaign did not market cigarettes as weight loss devices, it set the precedent for the new trends in niche marketing that would come to shape the future ways in which the industry would posit new types of cigarettes as weight loss aids. Moreover, it would forever change the public's thoughts on women smoking, transforming the act from a transgressive one into a normalized feminine behavior.

=== 1968–present ===
In 1964, the Surgeon General of the United States released the Surgeon General's Advisory Committee Report on Smoking and Health. This report lead to the Federal Cigarette Labeling and Advertising Act in 1965, which would mandate that all cigarette packs display warning labels and would change the ways that the tobacco industry would reach consumers via advertising. In April 1964, with Federal Trade Commission statutes pending, the tobacco industry would take on a program of self-regulation in its advertising. This program would become known as the Cigarette Advertising Code, and as Allen Brandt explains, the program:

promised to ban all cigarette advertising aimed at those under twenty-one; to ban all unproven health claims; and to ban the ‘virility’ theme. It also assured that models under twenty-five years of age would not be used in tobacco ads, nor would testimonials by entertainers or athletes be allowed. Finally, the code prohibited ads depicting smoking as ‘essential’ to social prominence, distinction, success or sexual attraction.'

With these regulations in place, the tobacco industry could no longer directly market cigarettes to women as weight loss aids like they had in the past. Rather, they would come to rely upon more subversive forms of marketing to target women's concerns with weight management.

==== Virginia Slims ====
In 1968, shortly after the enactment of the Cigarette Advertising Code, Philip Morris introduced a new brand of cigarettes called Virginia Slims. Following in the footsteps of Lucky Strike, Virginia Slims were marketed specifically to young, affluent, and independent women with the tagline created by the advertising agency, Leo Burnett, “You’ve come a long way, baby” referencing the history of women's liberation. With a colorful, pastel package and female-oriented print advertising featuring beautiful and elegant women, Philip Morris sought to create a cigarette that embodied women's concerns with glamour, style and body image. Moreover, the brand created rift in the market that differentiated between men's and women's cigarettes.

But perhaps most importantly, Virginia Slims appeal to women's ideals about slimness in their name: Virginia “Slims”—a key value that was not lost on consumers. In The Cigarette Century, Allen Brandt recounts United States Supreme Court case Cipollone v. Liggett Group, Inc., in which habitual tobacco user, Rose Cipollone, filed suit against Liggett and Myers, Lorillard and Philip Morris in five separate tort cases, citing their cigarettes as the cause of her cancer. During her deposition, Cipollone recounted her smoking history, noting that she switched to Virginia Slims in 1968 because female-centered marking appealed to her. Brandt writes that Cipollone described the cigarettes as “the first cigarette for women only...designed slimmer for a woman’s slimmer hands and lips...and packed in a slim purse pack.”

While Federal Trade Commission regulations prohibited brands from claiming any health benefits like weight loss, Virginia Slims appeal to women's concerns with aesthetic slimness with their elongated shape and narrow circumference. While traditional cigarettes are 84mm in length, Virginia Slims come in both 100 and 120mm lengths that give the cigarette a more dainty or elegant appearance. Moreover, with a 23mm circumference, slim cigarettes are said to produce less smoke than traditional cigarettes. Slim cigarettes are becoming popular in certain countries.

==== Virginia Slims and athleticism ====
Cigarettes have a long tradition of being coupled with athletics, health and fitness. As early as the mid-to-late 19th century, Bull Durham cigarettes were the official sponsors of professional baseball, horse racing and golf, and by the 1950s, Camel commonly used sports imagery in their print advertisements.

Thus, it was not unheard of when Virginia Slims sponsored the Women's Tennis Association in 1970, then known as the “Virginia Slims Circuit”. With this prominent sponsorship came a whole slew of advertisements that featured tennis greats like Billie Jean King and Rosemary Casals alongside the Virginia Slims logo.

Other Virginia Slims advertisements feature slender women in varying states of activity (dancing, running, ice skating, etc.) thus promoting a general attitude of health and fitness.

== New gender issues ==
A new area of study examines the ways in which tobacco companies are targeting the gay community through advertising. Like early niche advertisements that appealed to female consumers, gay tobacco advertisements draw on themes of virility and body image, although it is unclear if gay men tend to smoke to control weight. While the tobacco industry's marketing of the gay community is legal, many within the community have expressed disapproval of the industry's pointed tactics. Qualitative syntheses of young adults’ accounts of smoking have described how some young women use smoking to manage appearance and perform particular forms of femininity, including maintaining a slim body shape. These studies also highlight that such practices are shaped by intersecting social positions, with class, ethnicity and other marginalised identities influencing how smoking is used to negotiate attractiveness, respectability and belonging.

== Smoking cessation ==
Weight gain as a side effect of smoking cessation remains a major aspect of smoking and weight control. People can be discouraged by weight gain experienced while quitting smoking. Weight gain is a common experience during smoking cessation, with roughly 75% of smokers gaining weight after quitting. As nicotine is an appetite suppressant and smokers expend more energy, weight gain due to smoking cessation is generally attributed to increased calorific intake and a slowed metabolic rate.

Weight gain can be a deterrent in the smoking cessation process, even if many smokers did not smoke for weight control purposes. Those in the process of quitting smoking are recommended to follow a healthy diet and to exercise regularly. Most quitting advice encourages people to not be discouraged should they experience weight gain while quitting smoking, as the health benefits of quitting almost always exceed the costs of weight gain. Clinical trials have developed smoking cessation interventions that incorporate cognitive–behavioural weight management, including structured diet, physical activity and body-image components. Among weight-concerned smokers, such programmes have been reported to improve weight-control skills and related cognitions without clearly reducing progress toward smoking cessation when compared with standard counselling. Studies have shown that weight gain during the smoking cessation process can often be lost eventually through diet and exercise.

Contemporary public health guidance notes that not everyone who stops smoking gains weight and emphasises that post-cessation weight largely depends on dietary choices and levels of physical activity. Advice from health services commonly stresses that maintaining a balanced diet and regular physical activity can substantially improve the likelihood of achieving or returning to a healthy weight after quitting smoking.

== See also ==
- Nicotine marketing
- Nicotine withdrawal
- Weight loss
