= Buccal exostosis =

- Other names: Alveolar exostosis
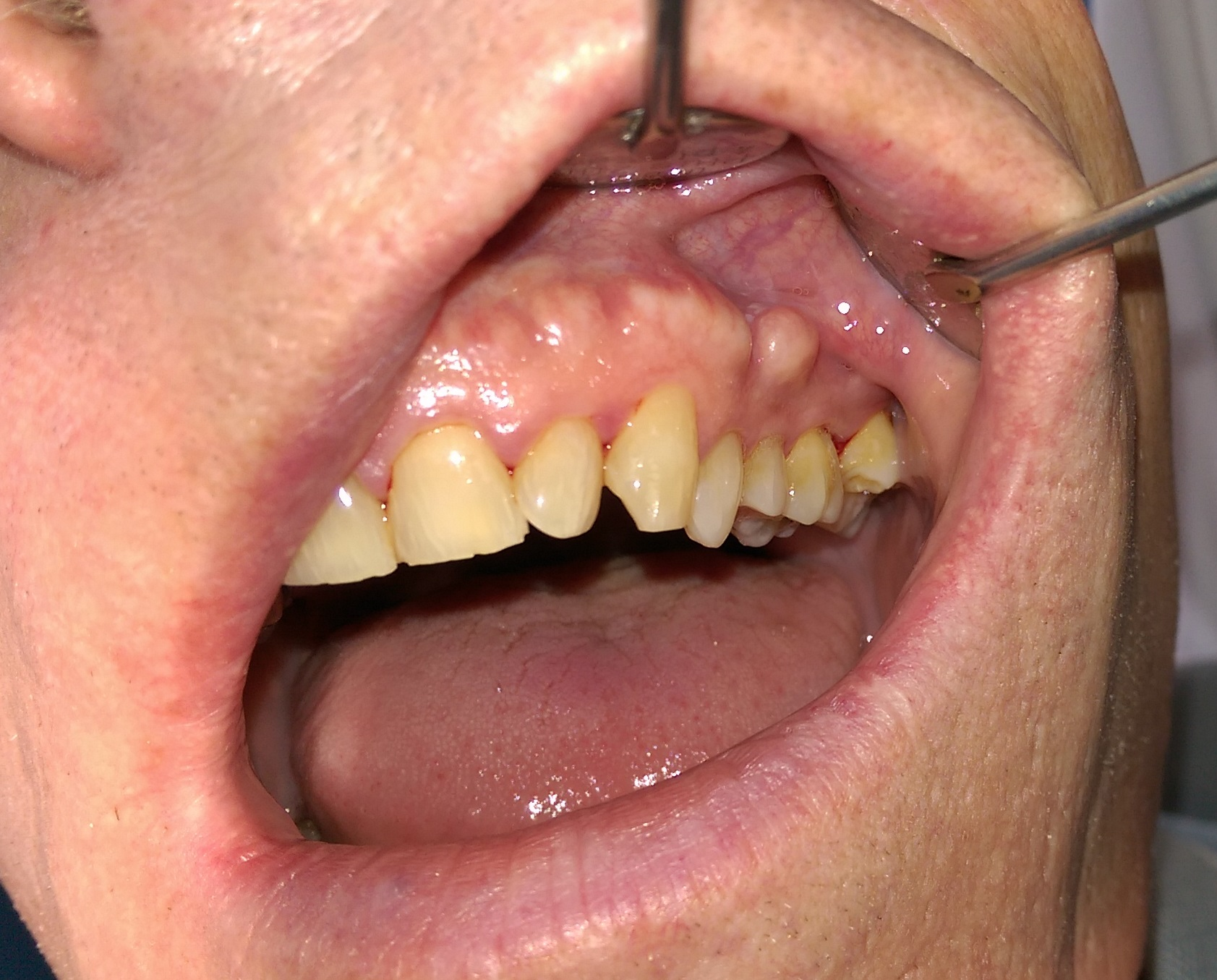
- Buccal exostosis along upper left alveolar ridge
- Specialty: Oral medicine

A buccal exostosis is an exostosis (bone prominence) on the buccal surface (cheek side) of the alveolar ridge of the maxilla or mandible. More commonly seen in the maxilla than the mandible, buccal exostoses are considered to be site specific. Existing as asymptomatic bony nodules, buccal exostoses do not typically present until adult life, and some consider buccal exostoses to be a variation of normal anatomy rather than a diagnosable disease. As a theoretical mechanism of origin, bone is thought to become hyperplastic, consisting of mature cortical and trabecular bone with a smooth outer surface. Buccal extoses are less common than the somewhat similar mandibular tori, which more often present on the interior lower jaw.

== Signs and symptoms ==
Buccal exostoses are bony hamartomas, which are non-malignant, exophytic nodular outgrowths of dense cortical bone that are relatively avascular.’

Symptoms:

Buccal exostoses generally tend to be asymptomatic and are usually painless. However, they may increase patient concern about poor aesthetics, inability to perform oral hygiene procedures due to difficulty in cleaning around the area with a toothbrush, and compromised periodontal health by causing food lodgement, which could lead to patients reporting increased bleeding when tooth brushing.

Signs:

- They tend to appear in early adolescence and may very slowly increase in size with time.
- Buccal exostoses generally occur bilaterally.
- Found usually in the premolar and molar region.
- These benign growths affect both the jaws. The maxilla is shown to display a higher prevalence rate of 5.1:1 in comparison to mandible. Males also are afflicted more than females with a prevalence rate of 1.66:1, in all intraoral locations.

The overlying mucosa appears to be stretched but intact and normal in colour.

== Causes ==
Why buccal exostoses form is unclear, but it may involve bruxism (tooth clenching and grinding), and genetic factors. Typically they first appear in early adulthood.

== Diagnosis ==
The presence of buccal exostosis can be diagnosed by both clinical examination and radiological interpretation of the oral cavity.

Clinically, buccal exostoses appear as single, broad-based masses, usually situated bilaterally in the premolar and molar region on the facial surface of the maxillary alveolar bone. The mass is generally smooth although in some cases a sharp, bony prominence may be present resulting in tenderness beneath the mucosa. Initial presentation usually occurs in early adolescence and the lesions may slowly enlarge up to 3–4 cm in diameter with time, however there is no malignant potential. Despite buccal exostoses being generally painless and self-limiting, they may cause patient concern regarding poor aesthetics, food lodgement and compromised oral hygiene. Their tendency to grow in size may also contribute to periodontal disease as a result of food build up in the area of the lesion.

Radiographically, buccal exostoses can be identified as round, well-defined structures which superimpose the roots of the teeth, normally in the premolar and molar region. Dental panoramic tomography and cone beam tomography can be used to confirm diagnosis.

An additional biopsy for diagnosis of buccal exostosis is not usually recommended, however it is important to rule out the possibility of early osteosarcomas and chondrosarcomas. In addition, it is recommended that patients who present with multiple growths showing similar characteristics but not in the classic exostoses locations should be evaluated for Gardner syndrome.

== Management ==
Currently, buccal exostoses do not commonly require treatment. If there is neither pain nor sensitivity, the buccal exostosis simply needs to be monitored with routine dental check-ups. Patients are given oral hygiene advice and are advised to cleanse above and below the growth with a mouthwash once a day to remove any food debris. Due to it being difficult to clean around the exostosis, periodontal disease can often occur as a result, and so this should be treated by the dentist or dental hygienist/therapist. There are, however, some occasions where treatment is required, for example;

- If the skin overlying it is continually experiencing trauma due to sharp foods,
- A prosthesis, such as a denture, is required and cannot be adapted to the exostosis,
- The growth reaches an unmanageable size,
- Aesthetic reasons.

If the growth needs to be removed then a simple surgical procedure can be carried out under local anaesthetic with no recurrence in the long-term follow up. This is done by reflecting the mucoperiosteal flap in order to expose the extended bone for complete excision. This bone will then be sent for histopathological examination to differentiate from benign to malignant neoplastic processes. Routine post-operative instructions are given to the patient and occasionally antibiotics may be prescribed. The patient will then be recalled after 1 week in order to remove the sutures and often after a few months for post-operative follow up.

== Epidemiology ==
They are more common in males than females, occurring in a ratio of about 5:1. They are strongly associated with the presence of torus mandibularis and torus palatinus.
