= Trilli =

Spanish footballer, born 2003

Personal information
- Full name: Álvaro Pérez Campo
- Date of birth: 19 May 2003 (age 23)
- Place of birth: Ortigueira, Spain
- Height: 1.85 m (6 ft 1 in)
- Position: Right-back

Team information
- Current team: Valladolid

Youth career
- 2010–2014: Racing Ferrol
- 2014–2021: Deportivo La Coruña

Senior career*
Years	Team	Apps	(Gls)
2020–2021	Deportivo B	4	(0)
2021–2023	Deportivo La Coruña	20	(0)
2023–2025	Barcelona B	30	(0)
2025–	Valladolid	10	(0)
2026	→ Córdoba (loan)	5	(1)

International career^{‡}
2019	Spain U16	7	(0)
2021–	Spain U19	2	(1)
- * Club domestic league appearances and goals as of 6 June 2026 ‡ National team caps and goals as of 29 August 2023

Álvaro Pérez Campo (born 19 May 2003), commonly known as Trilli, is a Spanish footballer who plays as a right-back for Real Valladolid.

== Club career ==
=== Early career ===
Born in Ortigueira, A Coruña, Galicia, Trilli started his football career at Racing de Ferrol with his brothers, Raúl and Javi, where they played in the youth sector of the club. He signed for Deportivo de La Coruña's youth side in 2014 before eventually getting promoted to their Juvenil B side for the 2019–20 season. Trilli accumulated 5 appearances during that season but due to injury and COVID-19, his playing time remained restricted.

=== Deportivo La Coruña ===
Despite struggling to get playing time, Trilli was called up to Dépor's reserves in Tercera División, making his debut on 13 December 2020 by starting in a 2–1 away win over SD Fisterra. The following 6 August, he extended his contract until 2024 and was called up for the first-team after pre-season.

Trilli made his first-team debut on 29 August 2021, the first match of the 2021–22 Primera División RFEF, in a 5–0 victory over Celta de Vigo B. Within a week later, Trilli suffered a muscle injury in the iliopsoas of his left leg and was assumed to be out for 3 to 4 weeks, before returning to training in October.

Trilli only returned to action on 1 December 2021, when he started in a Copa del Rey tie against UCAM Murcia CF. From there, he made a further nine league appearances for the club before suffering from an anterior impingement in March 2022 that would leave him out for the rest of the season. As a result, Trilli had surgery performed on his ankle in June 2022 and returned to rehabilitation with the club's medical department in July 2022.

Following his return to fitness in August 2022 under Óscar Cano, Trilli was placed as a third-choice starter at right-back under Antoñito and Diego Villares, both of whom impressed during preseason in which Trilli was injured. During the season, his lack of playing time was contributed by continuous discomfort with the left leg, Trilli finished the 2022–23 season with 11 league appearances and was announced by the club that he was departing in July 2023.

=== Barcelona ===
On 23 July 2023, Trilli signed a two-year deal with FC Barcelona after an agreement was reached with Deportivo. He was assigned to the reserves also in the third division.

=== Valladolid ===
On 18 July 2025, Segunda División side Real Valladolid on a two-year contract. The following 21 January, after being rarely used, he moved to fellow league team Córdoba CF on loan until June.

== International career ==
Trilli is a Spanish youth international and has represented the Spanish U16, U17, U18 and U19 squads.

== Career statistics ==
=== Club ===
As of match played 17 November 2024

Appearances and goals by club, season and competition
Club	Season	League			Cup		Other		Total	
Club	Season	Division	Apps	Goals	Apps	Goals	Apps	Goals	Apps	Goals
Deportivo B	2020–21	Tercera División	4	0	0	0	0	0	4	0
Deportivo La Coruña	2021–22	Primera División RFEF	10	0	2	0	0	0	12	0
Deportivo La Coruña	2022–23	Primera Federación	10	0	1	0	1 (Note: Appearance in 2023 Primera Federación play-offs)	0	12	0
Deportivo La Coruña	Total		20	0	3	0	1	0	24	0
Barcelona B	2023–24	Primera Federación	10	0	0	0	0	0	10	0
Barcelona B	2024–25	Primera Federación	19	0	0	0	0	0	19	0
Barcelona B	Total		20	0	0	0	0	0	20	0
Career total			44	0	3	0	1	0	48	0
