= Exostosis =

Formation of new bone on a bone

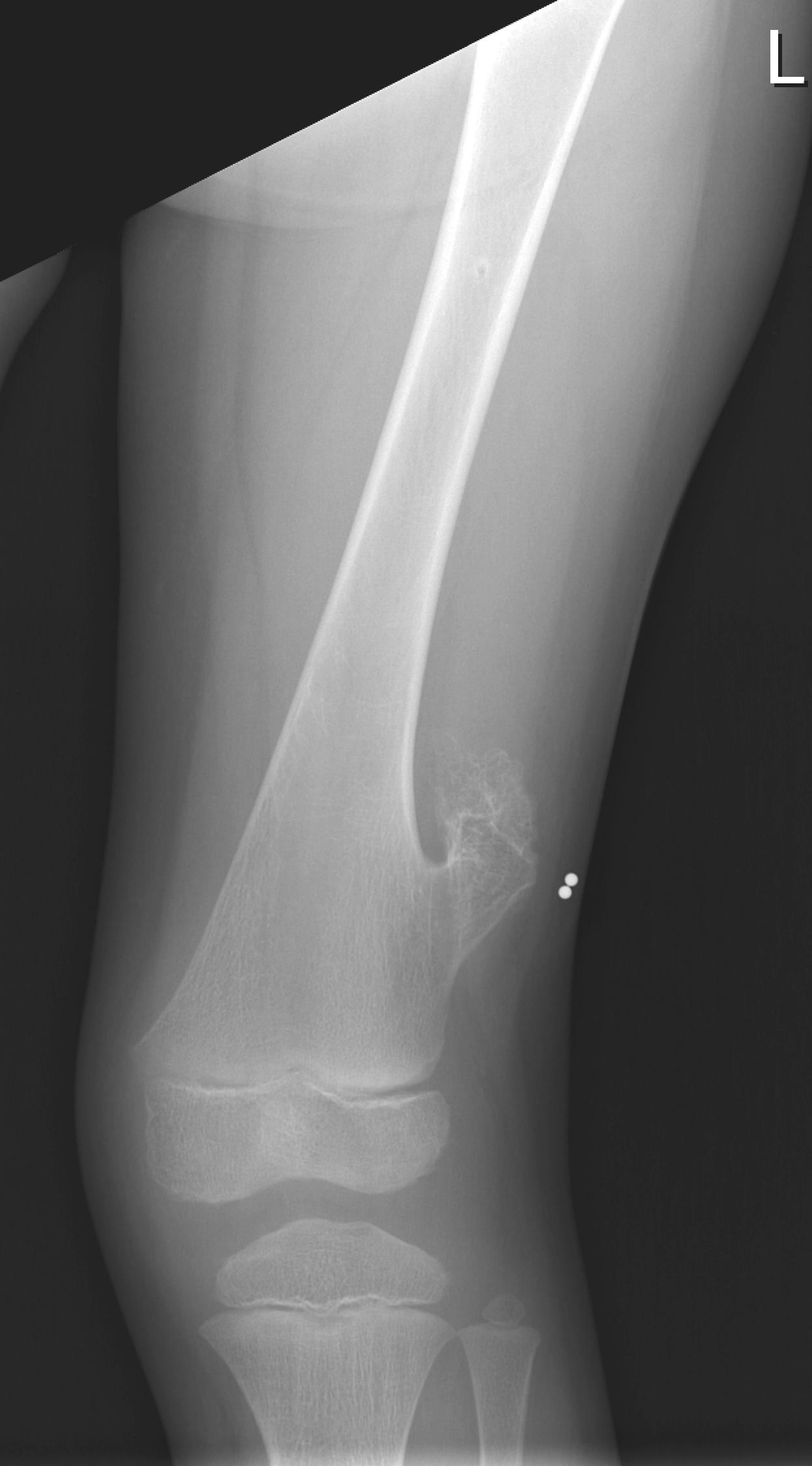
- X-ray of the left femur of a 5-year-old boy with an osteochondroma (a type of exostosis) at the lateral side, just above the knee.
- Specialty: Rheumatology

An exostosis (pl. exostoses) is a benign (non-cancerous) new growth projecting from the surface of a bone, informally known as a bone spur. Exostoses can cause chronic pain ranging from mild to severe, depending on the shape, size, and location of the lesion, though most are asymptomatic and are found by chance on plain x-ray taken for other reasons. Occasionally, an exostosis can be potentially life-threatening.

When used in the phrases "cartilaginous exostosis" or "osteocartilaginous exostosis", the term is considered synonymous with osteochondroma. Some sources consider the two terms to mean the same thing even without qualifiers, but this interpretation is not universal.

Osteomyelitis, a bone infection, may leave the adjacent bone with exostosis formation. Charcot foot, the neuropathic breakdown of the feet seen primarily in diabetics, can also leave bone spurs that may then become symptomatic.

== Osteophytes ==
Osteophytes are bone spurs that develop on the margins of joints secondary to external stimuli such as osteoarthritis. However, these are not always distinguished from extoses in any definite way.

== Fossil record ==
Evidence for exostosis found in the fossil record is studied by paleopathologists, specialists in ancient disease and injury. Exostosis has been reported in dinosaur fossils from several species, including Acrocanthosaurus atokensis, Albertosaurus sarcophagus, Allosaurus fragilis, Gorgosaurus libratus, and Poekilopleuron bucklandii.

== Osteochondromas ==
Osteochondromas are benign chondrogenic lesions derived from aberrant cartilage from the perichondral ring. They are most commonly found in pre-teens through early 20s adjacent to the physes of the distal femur and proximal tibia but can be found adjacent to other physes, most notably the distal phalanx of the finger, where it presents as a subungual mass. Larger growths can occur on places like the ankles, knees, shoulders, elbows and hips. Very rarely are they on the skull. Though rare, malignant transformation can occur into a chondrosarcoma.

== Hereditary multiple exostoses ==
Hereditary multiple exostoses (HME), also called hereditary multiple osteochondromas (HMO) and familial osteochondromatosis is a condition that is estimated to affect 1 in 50,000 individuals. Multiple benign or noncancerous bone tumors develop in the affected individuals. The number and location vary among affected patients. Most people seem unaffected at birth; however, by the age of 12 years, they develop multiple exostoses. Affected individuals commonly complain of palpable and recognizable lumps (exostoses) at about the knees and in the forearms. The condition characteristically occurs bilaterally. It may lead to mild degrees of growth retardation and limb asymmetry. Genu valgum (commonly known as "knock-knees"), ankle valgus, and bowing and shortening of one or both of the forearm bones are common manifestations.

== Types ==
- Buccal exostosis
- Enthesophyte
- Footballer's ankle (exostosis of the ankle bone)
- Hereditary multiple exostoses (HME)
- Osteochondroma
- Osteophyte
- Subungual exostosis (exostosis under the fingernail or toenail)
- Surfer's ear (exostosis of the ear canal)
- Torus mandibularis
- Torus palatinus
- Calcaneal spur (heel spur)

== See also ==
- Ganglion cyst
- List of radiographic findings associated with cutaneous conditions
- Osteoma
- Osteosclerosis
- Pachyosteosclerosis
- Pachyostosis
