= BiteStrip =

At-home test for sleep bruxism

The BiteStrip was a disposable self-use home test for Sleep Bruxism. Its indications correlate well with comparable indications from formal sleep lab studies.

Its commercialization was discontinued in 2019.

The device is a miniature but complete sleep EMG (electromyography) monitor, including two pre-gelled EMG electrodes, an amplifier, a micro-processor-based real time data acquisition and analysis hardware and software, and a permanent chemical display unit. The entire system is integrated on a small piece of lightweight plastic film attached to the user's cheek. By analyzing the jaw muscles’ EMG waveforms in real time during the night and presenting the result on the built-in display, the device doesn't need a large data memory, and the downloading and analysis phases, common to all current sleep recorders, are eliminated. Test results indicate the number of bruxing events detected per hour of sleep (bruxing index or BI). This indication appears as permanent numbers encoded onto the electrochemical display for easy reading. The device itself can serve as the medical record of the test. Self-test letters indicate the technical and clinical validity of the study.

Sleep Bruxism (SB) is a serious medical disorder, characterized by involuntary grinding and clenching of teeth during sleep. It is often accompanied by unpleasant grinding sounds heard by the bed-partner or roommate. Symptoms include wearing of teeth, temporomandibular joint (TMJ) dysfunction or pain, chewing difficulties, headaches, and daytime sleepiness. The prevalence of SB is estimated at 14–20% in children and 8% in adults . Diagnosis of SB is usually based on clinical examination and patient history. However, none of the signs and symptoms may be considered conclusive. Another alternative has been to send the patient to a sleep lab for an overnight test.
