= Torus removal surgery =

Surgical procedure

Torus removal surgery is a surgical procedure performed to remove one or more extra protuberances of bone either on the palate or the mandible. Although such segments of extra bone are not harmful in any way in and of themselves, their presence may present a problem for those patients who require certain types of dental prostheses, such as complete or partial dentures.
