= Footballer's ankle =

Type of sports injury

Footballer's ankle is a pinching or impingement of the ligaments or tendons of the ankle between the bones, particularly the talus and tibia. This results in pain, inflammation and swelling.

== Causes ==
A common cause of anterior impingement is a bone spur on anklebone (talus) or the shinbone (tibia). Repeated kicking actions can cause the anklebone to hit the bottom of the shinbone, which can lead to a lump of bone (or bone spur) developing. This bone spur may then begin to impact on the soft tissue at the front of the ankle, causing inflammation and swelling. The condition is most common in athletes who repeatedly bend the ankle upward (dorsiflexion), such as footballers, hence the name.

== Symptoms ==
- Pain and tenderness over anterior ankle joint
- Pain on dorsiflexion and plantar flexion
- Band of pain across anterior ankle when kicking a ball
- Palpable bony lump on distal tibia or superior talus

== Treatment ==
- Soft tissue techniques to stretch muscles crossing the ankle to relieve tension
- Mobilisation of ankle joint
- Steroid injection to reduce inflammation
- Surgery to remove bony spurs
