= Torus mandibularis =

- Other names: Tori mandibulares, mandibular torus, mandibular tori
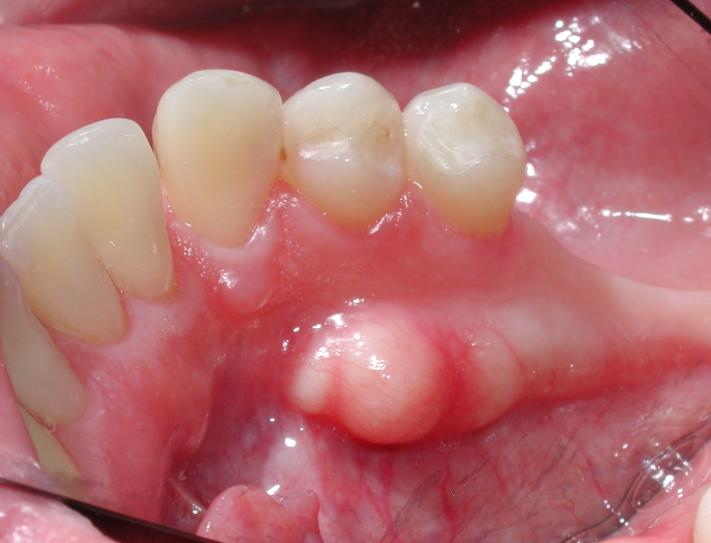
- Mandibular torus in premolar area
- Specialty: Oral and maxillofacial surgery

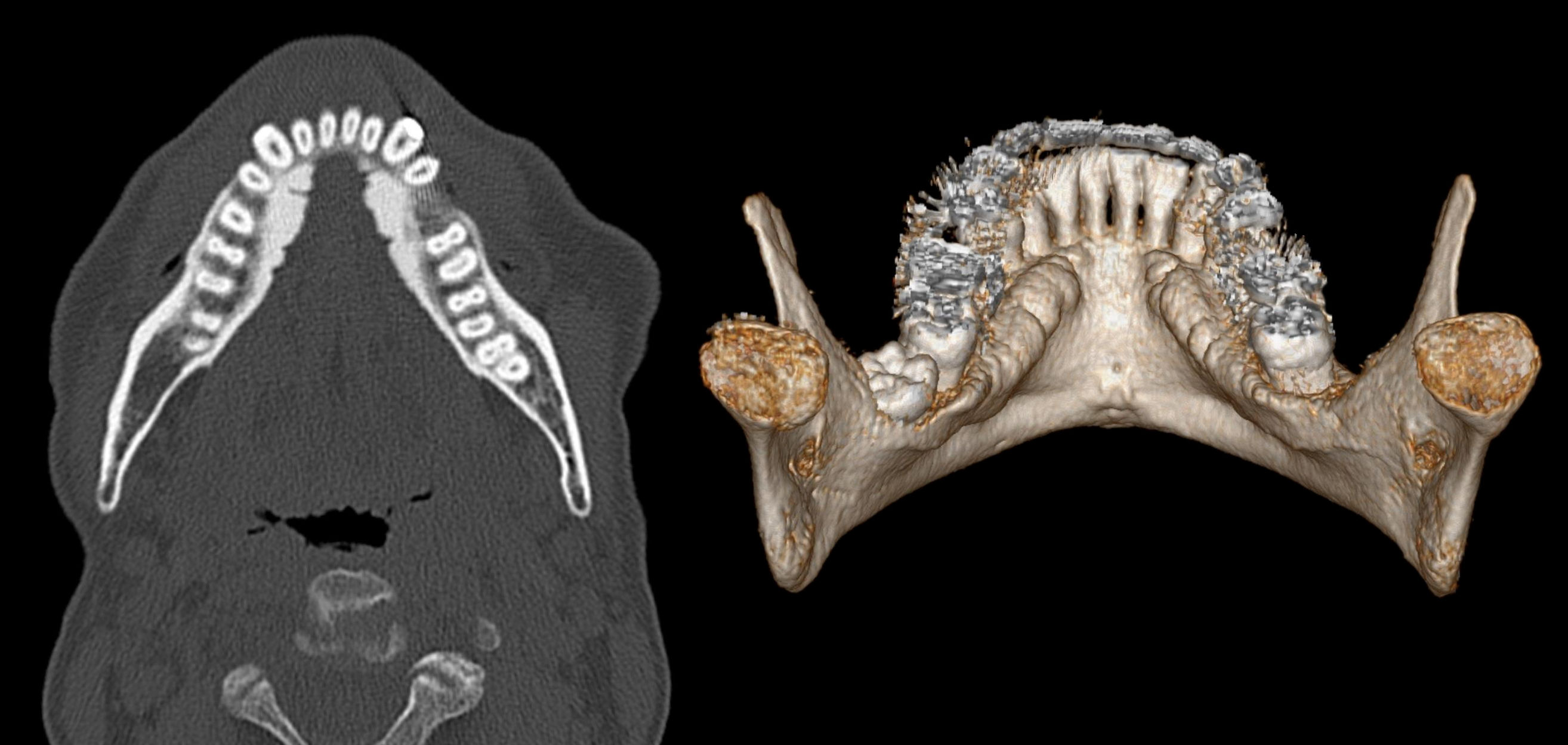
Torus mandibularis seen at axial CT and volume rendering

Torus mandibularis is a bony growth in the mandible along the surface nearest to the tongue. Mandibular tori usually are present near the premolars and above the location on the mandible of the mylohyoid muscle attachment. In 90% of cases, a torus is on both inner sides of the mandible (left and right); however, they may differ in size.

The prevalence of mandibular tori ranges from 5–40%. They are less common than bony growths occurring on the palate, known as torus palatinus. Mandibular tori are more common in Asian and Inuit populations. They are slightly more common in males. In the United States, the prevalence is 7–10% of the population.

It is believed that mandibular tori are caused by several factors, with local stress on individual teeth considered the most relevant factor. Development of tori is more common in early adulthood and is associated with bruxism. The size of tori may fluctuate throughout life and, in some cases, tori may become large enough to touch each other in the midline of the mouth. Consequently, it is believed that mandibular tori are the result of local stresses rather than occurring solely to genetic influences.

Typically, mandibular tori are clinical findings without the necessity of treatment. The presence of tori may complicate the fabrication of dentures. If removal of tori is deemed necessary, surgery can reduce the amount of bone, but tori may reform in cases where nearby teeth continue to receive local stresses. Ulcers may form in the area of tori because of trauma during mastication or from injury by utensils used during consumption of food or drink.
