= Torus palatinus =

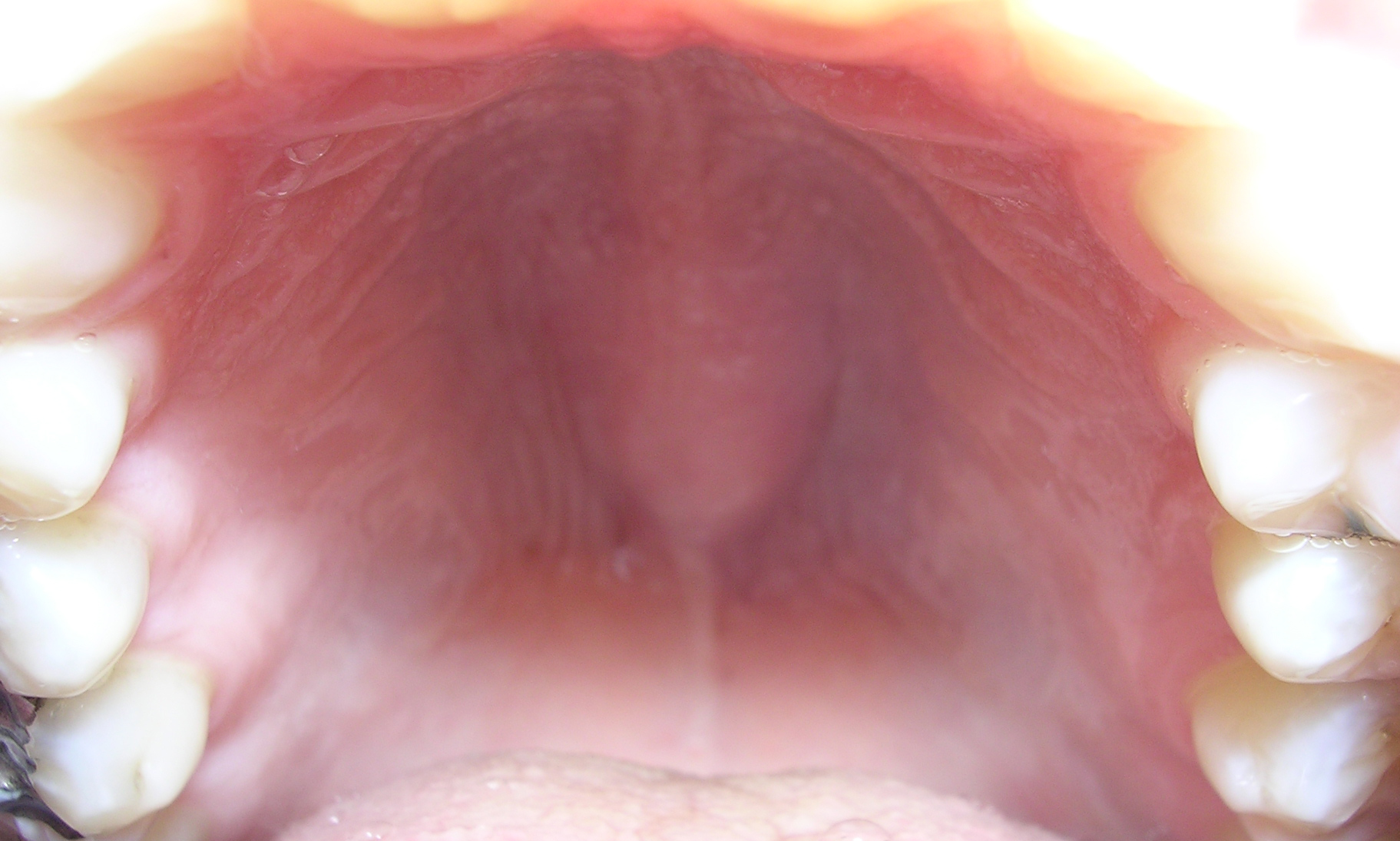
- An example of palatal torus
- Specialty: Oral and maxillofacial surgery

A torus palatinus (pl.: tori palatini), or palatal torus (pl.: palatal tori), is a bony protrusion on the palate. Palatal tori are usually present on the midline of the hard palate. Most palatal tori are less than 2 cm in diameter, but their size can change throughout life.

== Types ==
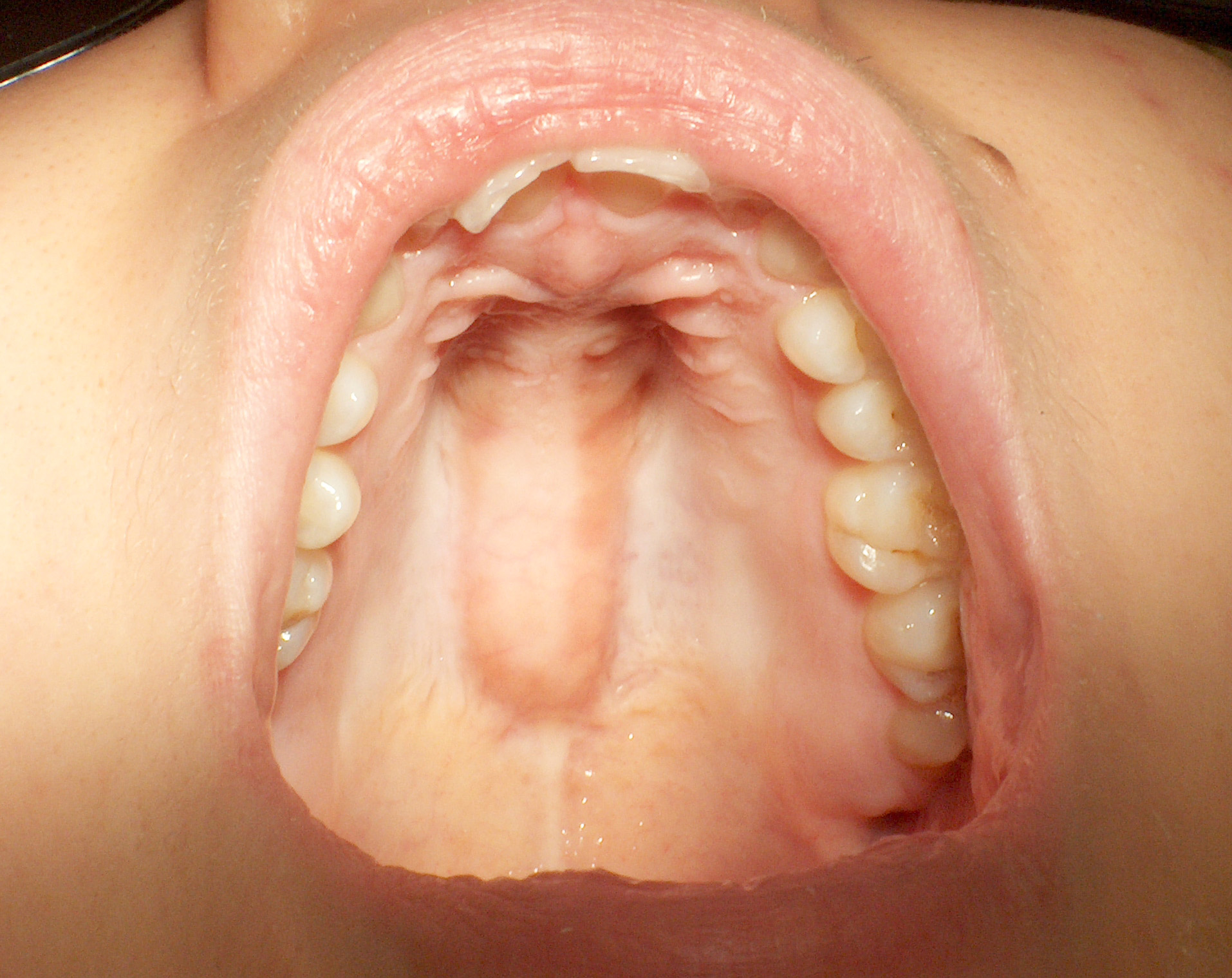
Another example of a torus palatinus

Sometimes, the tori are categorized by their appearance. Arising as a broad base and a smooth surface, flat tori are located on the midline of the palate and extend symmetrically to either side. Spindle tori have a ridge located at their midline. Nodular tori have multiple bony growths that each have their own base. Lobular tori have multiple bony growths with a common base.

== Cause ==
Although some research suggest palatal tori to be an autosomal dominant trait, it is generally believed that palatal tori are caused by several factors. They are more common in early adult life and can increase in size. In some older people, the size of the tori may decrease due to bone resorption. It is believed that tori of the lower jaw are the result of local stresses and not due solely to genetic influences.

== Treatment ==
Palatal tori are usually a clinical finding with no treatment necessary. It is possible for ulcers to form on the area of the tori due to repeated trauma. Also, the tori may complicate the fabrication of dentures. If removal of the tori is needed, surgery can be done to reduce the amount of bone present.

=== Surgical removal ===
A maxillary torus is only removed in instances where it is problematic. This includes cases where in an edentulous patient it extends to the vibrating line preventing a posterior seal of the denture and posterior seal at the fovea palatinae. Other indications for removal include frequent trauma to the torus, owing to its size or the thinness of the mucoperiosteum overlying it, disturbance of speech, and rapid growth in patients who are cancer-phobic.

== Prevalence ==
Prevalence of palatal tori ranges from 9–60% and is more common than bony growths occurring on the mandible, known as torus mandibularis. In the United States, the prevalence is 20–35% of the population.
